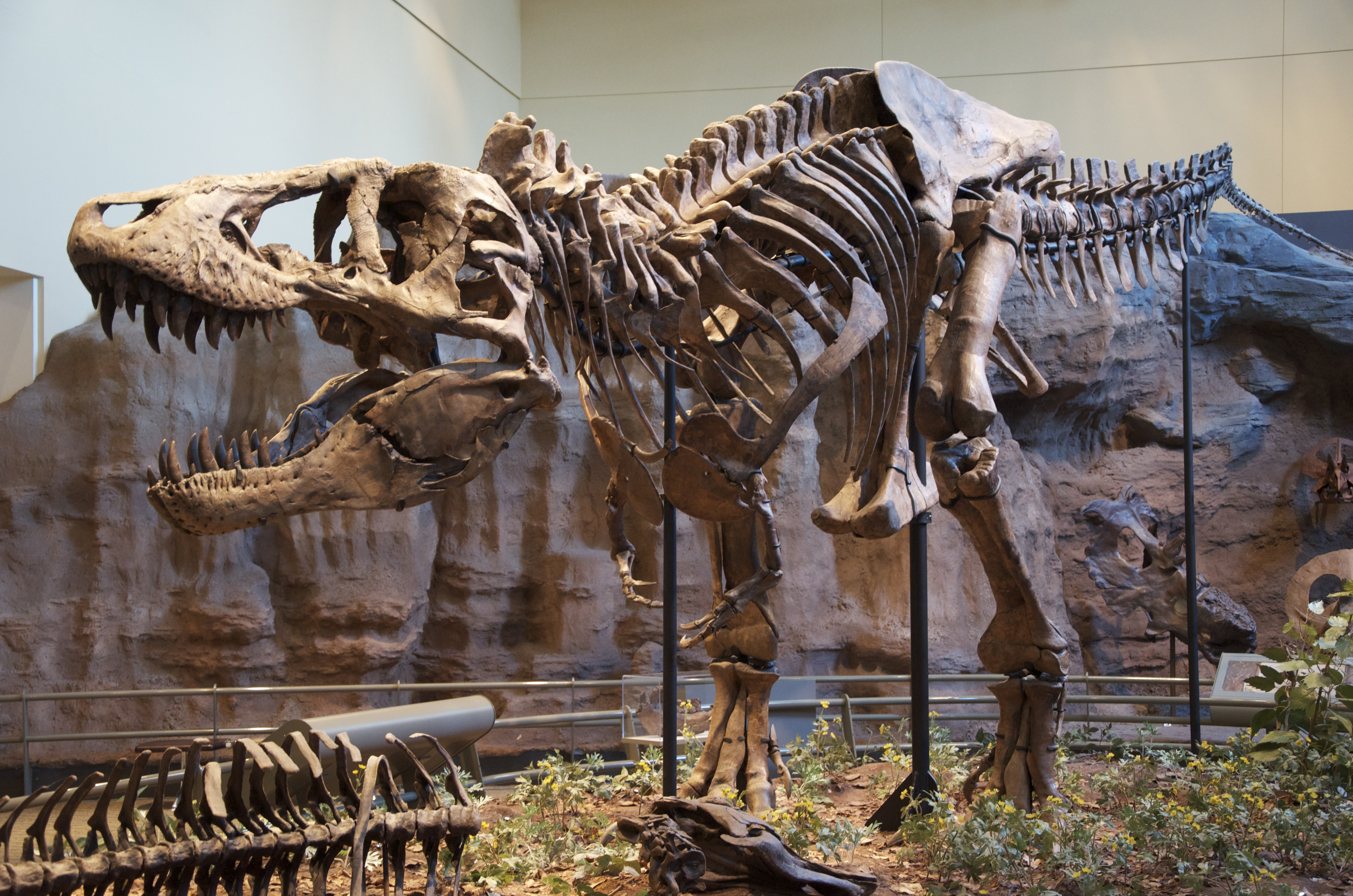
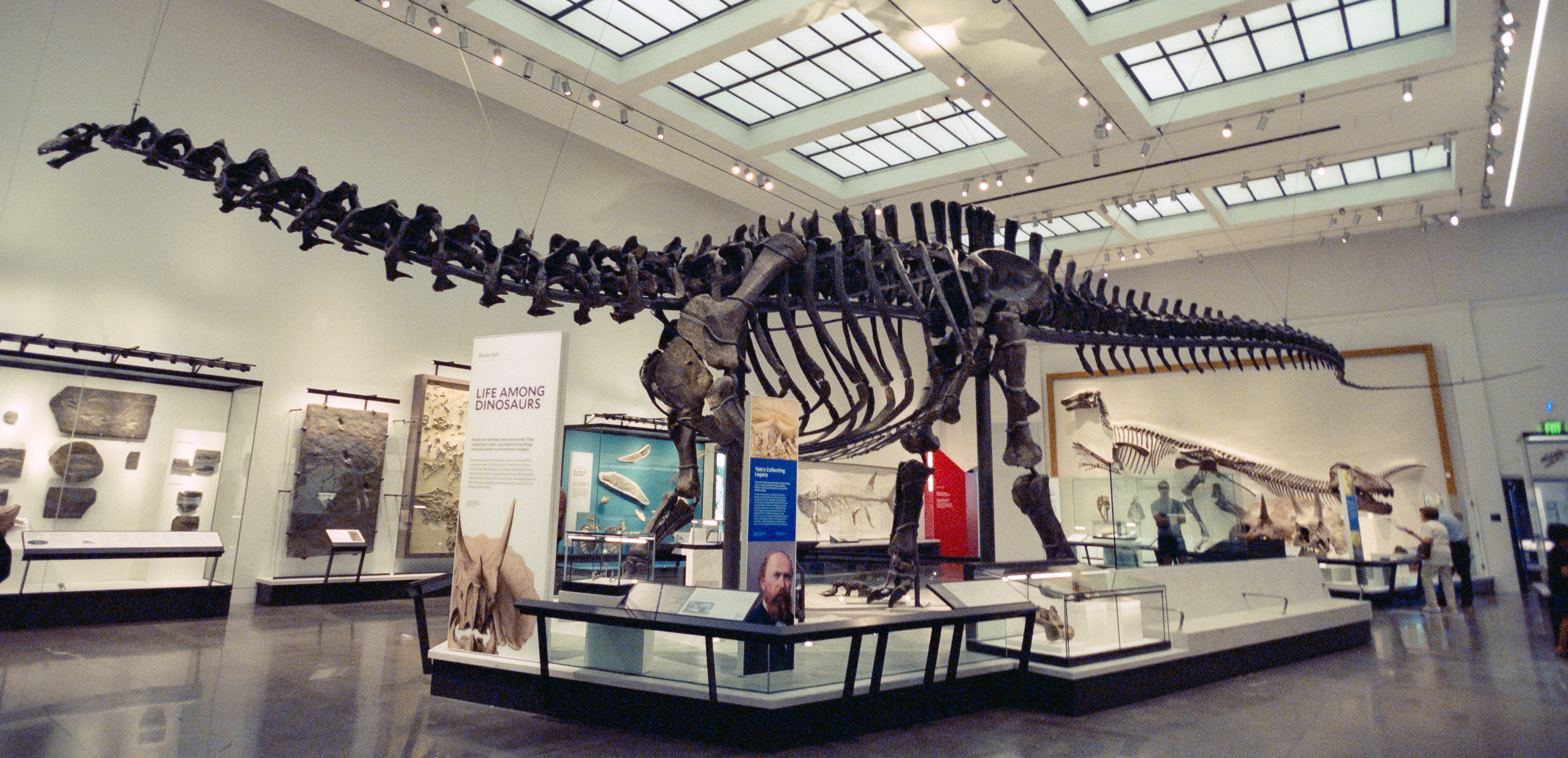
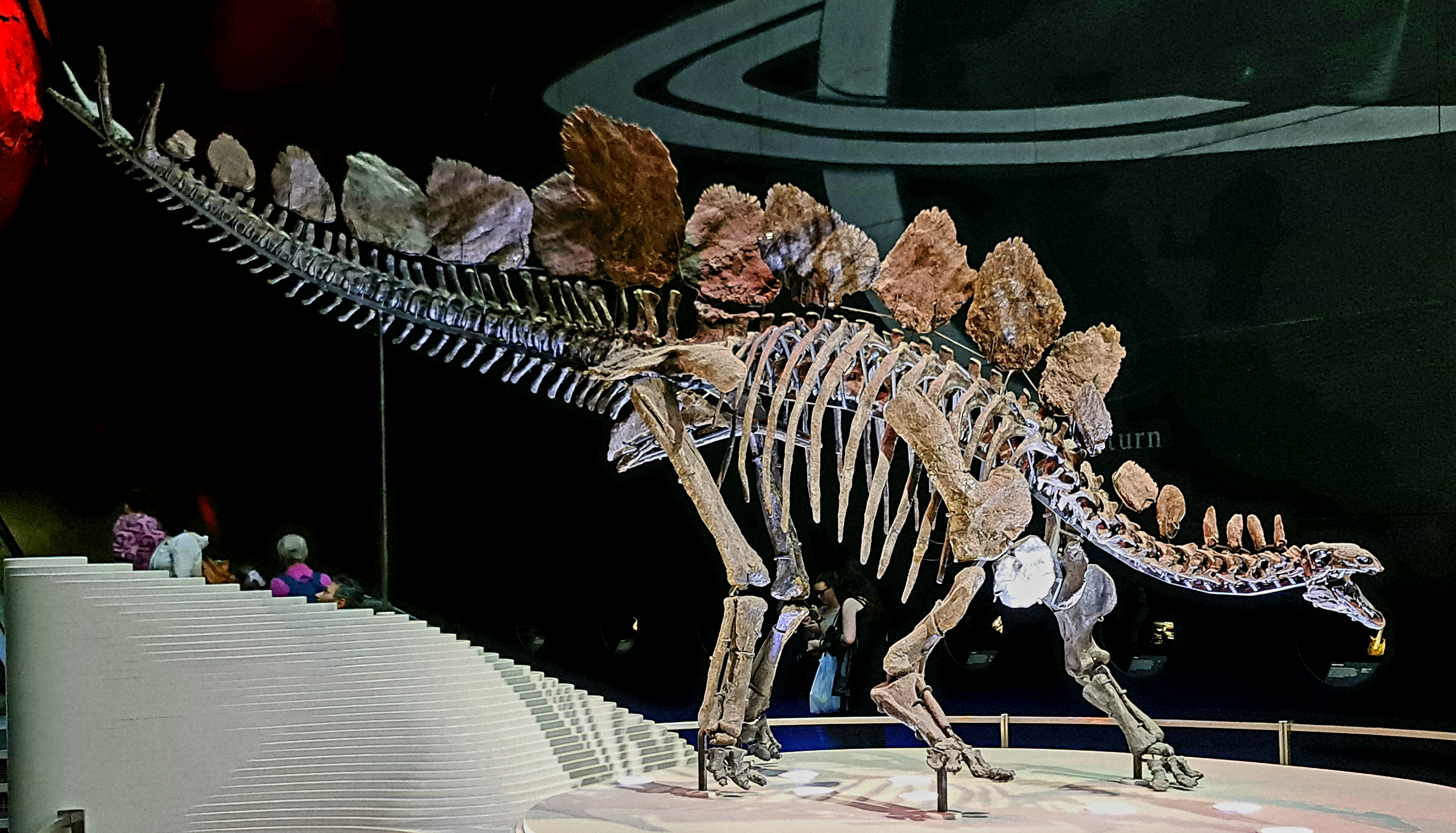
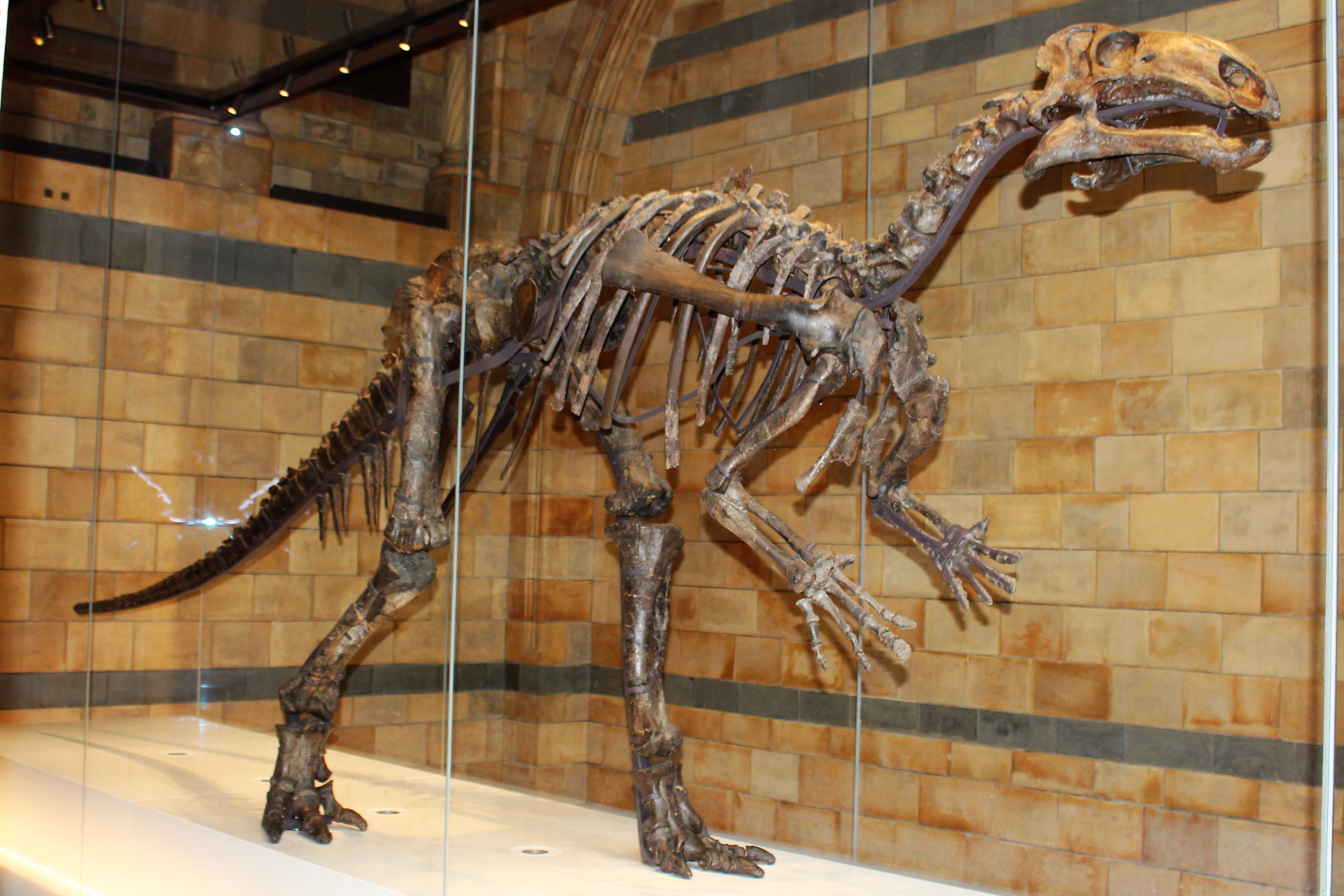
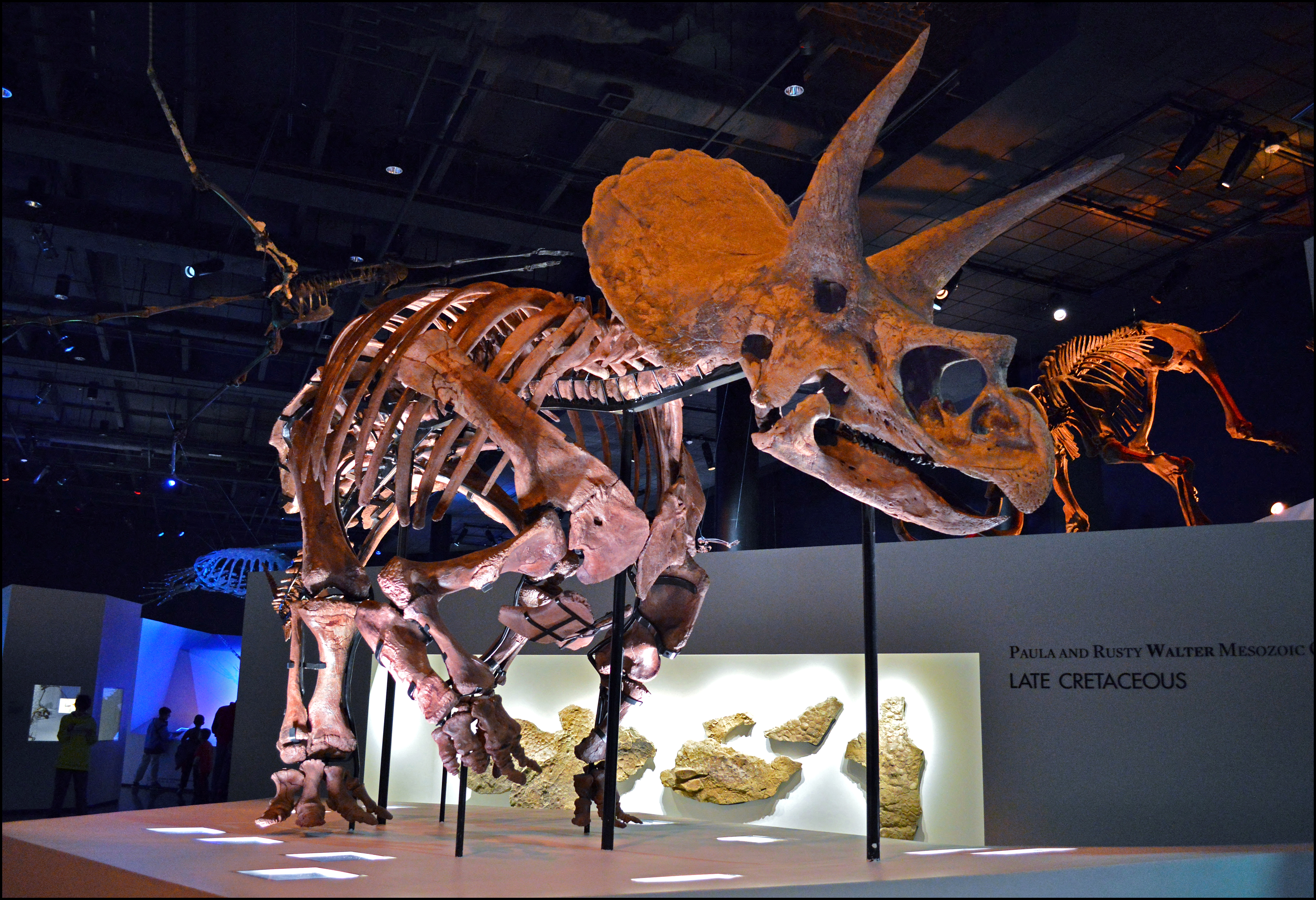
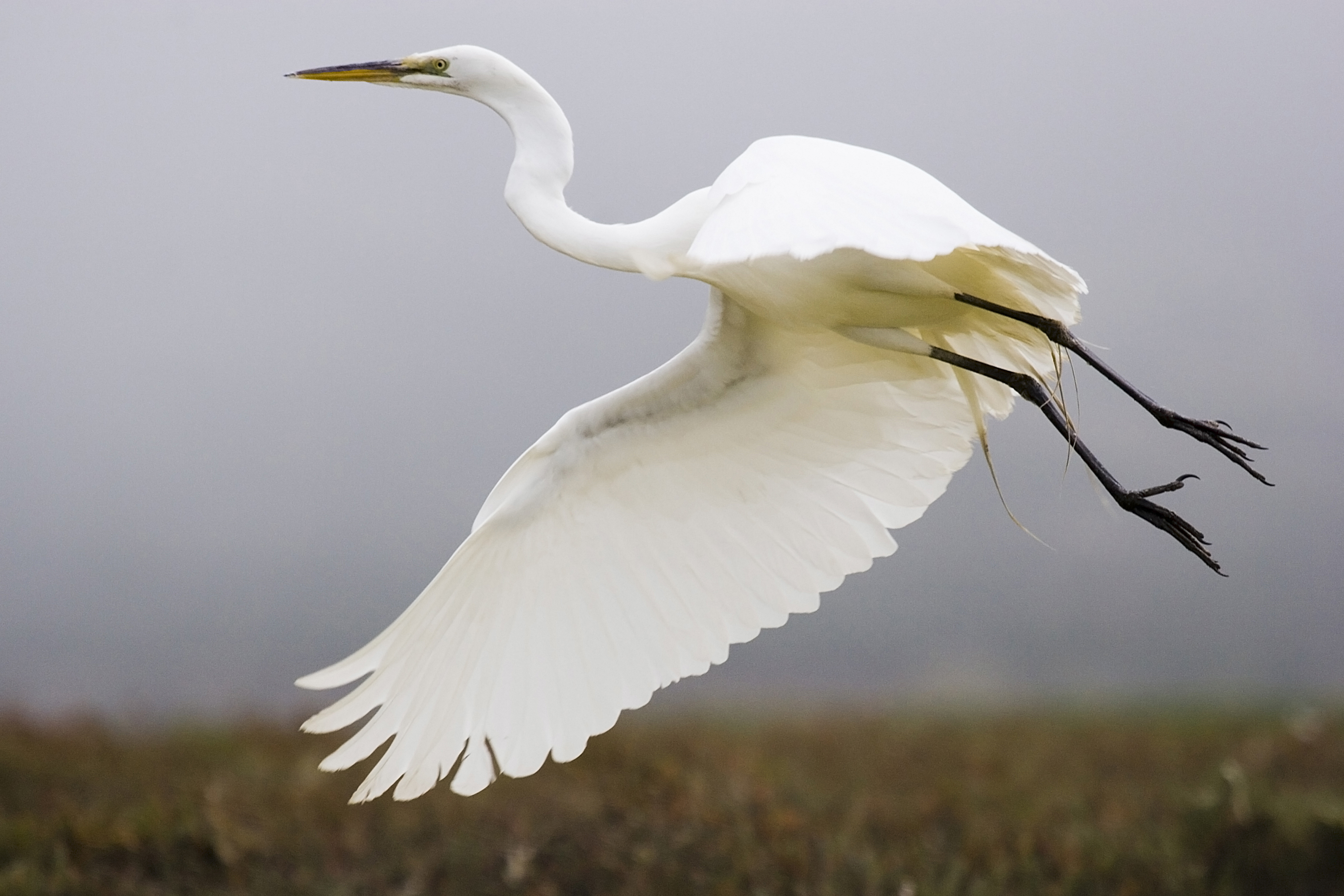
- A collection of dinosaurs. Clockwise from top left: Tyrannosaurus (a large theropod), Brontosaurus (a sauropod), Mantellisaurus (an ornithopod), a great egret (an avian theropod), Triceratops (a marginocephalian), and Stegosaurus (a thyreophoran).

Scientific classification
- Kingdom: Animalia
- Phylum: Chordata
- Class: Reptilia
- Clade: Archosauria
- Clade: Avemetatarsalia
- Clade: Ornithodira
- Clade: Dinosauromorpha
- Clade: Dinosauria; Owen, 1842

Major groups
- †Ornithischia
- Saurischia
  - †Sauropodomorpha
  - Theropoda
    - Various extinct groups
    - Aves (birds)
Dinosaurs and possible dinosaurs of uncertain affinity
- †Agnosphytis?
- †Alwalkeria
- †Chilesaurus
- †Chindesaurus
- †Daemonosaurus
- †Eodromaeus
- †Nhandumirim
- †Nyasasaurus?
- †Pisanosaurus?
- †Smok?
- †Tawa
- †Thecospondylus
- †Herrerasauria
- †Silesauridae? (paraphyletic?)

= Dinosaur =

Dinosaurs Temporal range: Late Triassic – Present, 233.23–0 mya (range includes birds) (possible Middle Triassic record)

Diverse clade of specialized reptiles

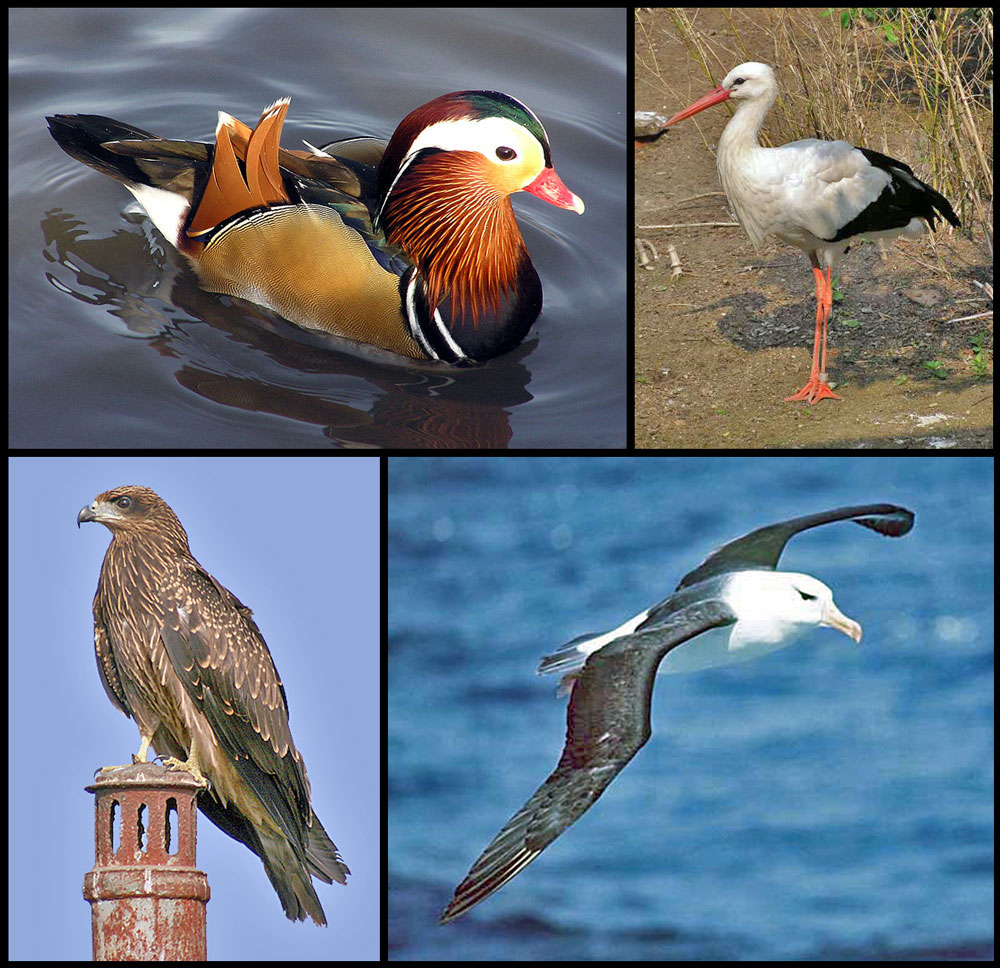
Birds are avian dinosaurs, and phylogenetic taxonomy includes over 11,000 extant species in the group Dinosauria.

Dinosaurs are a diverse group of warm-blooded reptiles (Note: Although not one of the traditional four orders of reptiles (Squamata, Crocodylia, Testudines and Rhynchocephalia), Dinosaurs (including birds) are members of the natural group formed by these orders.) of the clade Dinosauria. They existed through most of the Mesozoic era, first appearing early in the Triassic period. They became the dominant terrestrial vertebrates after the Triassic–Jurassic extinction event 201.3 mya and their dominance continued throughout the Jurassic and Cretaceous periods. The fossil record shows that birds are feathered dinosaurs, having evolved from earlier theropods during the Late Jurassic epoch, and are the only dinosaur lineage known to have survived the Cretaceous–Paleogene extinction event approximately 66 mya. Dinosaurs can therefore be divided into avian dinosaurs—birds—and the extinct non-avian dinosaurs, which are all dinosaurs other than birds.

Dinosaurs are varied from taxonomic, morphological and ecological standpoints. Birds, at over 11,000 living species, are among the most diverse groups of vertebrates. Using fossil evidence, paleontologists have identified over 900 distinct genera and more than 1,000 different species of non-avian dinosaurs. Dinosaurs are represented on every continent by both extant species (birds) and fossil remains. Through most of the 20th century, before birds were recognized as dinosaurs, most of the scientific community presumed dinosaurs to have been sluggish and cold-blooded. Most research conducted since the 1970s, however, has indicated that dinosaurs were active animals with elevated metabolisms and numerous adaptations for social interaction. Evidence shows that all dinosaurs had erect legs similar to that of birds and many mammals, as opposed to the sprawling leg stance of cold-blooded tetrapods. Some were herbivorous, others carnivorous. Evidence suggests that most dinosaurs were egg-laying, and that nest-building was a trait shared by many dinosaurs, both avian and non-avian.

While dinosaurs were ancestrally bipedal, many extinct groups included quadrupedal species, and some were able to shift between these stances. Elaborate display structures such as horns or crests are common to all dinosaur groups, and some extinct groups developed skeletal modifications such as bony armor and spines. While the dinosaurs' modern-day surviving avian lineage (birds) are generally small due to the constraints of flight, many non-avian dinosaurs were large-bodied—the largest sauropod dinosaurs are estimated to have reached lengths of 39.7 meters (130 feet) and heights of 18 m (59 ft) and were the largest land animals of all time.

The first dinosaur fossils were recognized in the early 19th century, with the name "dinosaur" (meaning "terrible lizard") being coined by Sir Richard Owen in 1842 to refer to these "great fossil lizards". Since then, mounted fossil dinosaur skeletons have been major attractions at museums worldwide, and dinosaurs have become an enduring part of popular culture. The large sizes of some dinosaurs, as well as their seemingly monstrous and fantastic nature, have ensured their regular appearance in best-selling books and films, such as the Jurassic Park franchise. Persistent public enthusiasm for the animals has resulted in significant funding for dinosaur science, and new discoveries are regularly covered by the media.

== Etymology ==
In 1842 the English paleontologist Sir Richard Owen coined the term "dinosaur", using it to refer to the "distinct tribe or sub-order of Saurian Reptiles" that were then being recognized in England and around the world. The term is derived from Ancient Greek δεινός (deinos) 'terrible, potent or fearfully great' and σαῦρος (sauros) 'lizard or reptile'. Though the taxonomic name has often been interpreted as a reference to dinosaurs' teeth, claws, and other fearsome characteristics, Owen intended it also to evoke their size and majesty.

== Definition ==
Under phylogenetic nomenclature, dinosaurs are usually defined as the group consisting of the most recent common ancestor (MRCA) of Triceratops and modern birds (Neornithes), and all its descendants. It has also been suggested that Dinosauria be defined with respect to the MRCA of Megalosaurus and Iguanodon, because these were two of the three genera cited by Richard Owen when he recognized the Dinosauria. Both definitions cover the same known genera: Dinosauria = Ornithischia + Saurischia. This includes major groups such as ankylosaurians (armored herbivorous quadrupeds), stegosaurians (plated herbivorous quadrupeds), ceratopsians (bipedal or quadrupedal herbivores with neck frills), pachycephalosaurians (bipedal herbivores with thick skulls), ornithopods (bipedal or quadrupedal herbivores including "duck-bills"), theropods (mostly bipedal carnivores and birds), and sauropodomorphs (mostly large herbivorous quadrupeds with long necks and tails).

Birds are the sole surviving dinosaurs. In traditional taxonomy, birds were considered a separate class that had evolved from dinosaurs. However, most contemporary paleontologists reject the traditional style of classification based on anatomical similarity, in favor of phylogenetic taxonomy based on deduced ancestry, in which each group is defined as all descendants of a given founding genus. Birds belong to the dinosaur subgroup Maniraptora, which are coelurosaurs, which are theropods, which are saurischians.

Research by Matthew G. Baron, David B. Norman, and Paul M. Barrett in 2017 suggested a radical revision of dinosaurian systematics. Phylogenetic analysis by Baron et al. recovered the Ornithischia as being closer to the Theropoda than the Sauropodomorpha, as opposed to the traditional union of theropods with sauropodomorphs. This would cause sauropods and kin to fall outside traditional dinosaurs, so they re-defined Dinosauria as the last common ancestor of Triceratops horridus, Passer domesticus and Diplodocus carnegii, and all of its descendants, to ensure that sauropods and kin remain included as dinosaurs. They also resurrected the clade Ornithoscelida to refer to the group containing Ornithischia and Theropoda.

=== General description ===
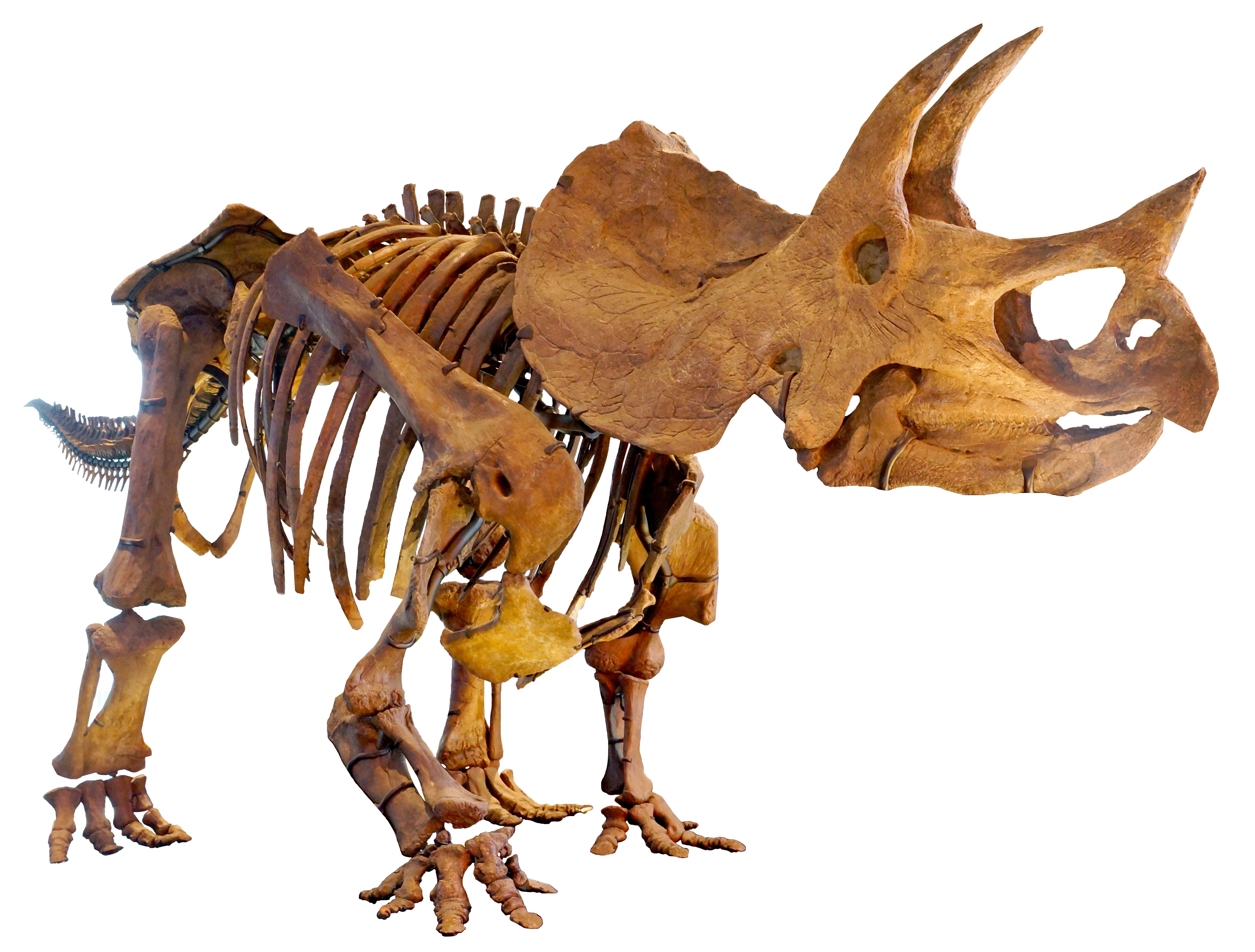
Triceratops skeleton, Natural History Museum of Los Angeles County

Using one of the above definitions, dinosaurs can be generally described as archosaurs with hind limbs held erect beneath the body. Other prehistoric animals, including pterosaurs, mosasaurs, ichthyosaurs, plesiosaurs, and Dimetrodon, while often popularly conceived of as dinosaurs, are not taxonomically classified as dinosaurs. Pterosaurs are distantly related to dinosaurs, being members of the clade Ornithodira. The other groups mentioned are, like dinosaurs and pterosaurs, members of Sauropsida (the reptile and bird clade), except Dimetrodon (which is a synapsid). None of them had the erect hind limb posture characteristic of true dinosaurs.

Dinosaurs were the dominant terrestrial vertebrates of the Mesozoic Era, especially the Jurassic and Cretaceous periods. Other groups of animals were restricted in size and niches; mammals, for example, rarely exceeded the size of a domestic cat and were generally rodent-sized carnivores of small prey. Dinosaurs have always been recognized as an extremely varied group: over 900 non-avian dinosaur genera have been confidently identified (2018) with 1,124 species (2016). Estimates put the total number of dinosaur genera preserved in the fossil record at 1850, nearly 75% still undiscovered, and the number that ever existed (in or out of the fossil record) at 3,400. A 2016 estimate put the number of dinosaur species living in the Mesozoic at 1,543–2,468, compared to the number of modern-day birds (avian dinosaurs) at 10,806 species.

Extinct dinosaurs, as well as modern birds, include genera that are herbivorous and others carnivorous, including seed-eaters, fish-eaters, insectivores, and omnivores. While dinosaurs were ancestrally bipedal (as are all modern birds), some evolved into quadrupeds, and others, such as Anchisaurus and Iguanodon, could walk as easily on two or four legs. Cranial modifications like horns and crests are common dinosaurian traits, and some extinct species had bony armor. Although the best-known genera are remarkable for their large size, many Mesozoic dinosaurs were human-sized or smaller, and modern birds are generally small in size. Dinosaurs today inhabit every continent, and fossils show that they had achieved global distribution by the Early Jurassic epoch at latest. Modern birds inhabit most available habitats, from terrestrial to marine, and there is evidence that some non-avian dinosaurs (such as Microraptor) could fly or at least glide, and others, such as spinosaurids, had semiaquatic habits.

=== Distinguishing anatomical features ===
While recent discoveries have made it more difficult to present a universally agreed-upon list of their distinguishing features, nearly all dinosaurs discovered so far share certain modifications to the ancestral archosaurian skeleton, or are clearly descendants of older dinosaurs showing these modifications. Although some later groups of dinosaurs featured further modified versions of these traits, they are considered typical for Dinosauria; the earliest dinosaurs had them and passed them on to their descendants. Such modifications, originating in the most recent common ancestor of a certain taxonomic group, are called the synapomorphies of such a group.

Labeled diagram of a typical archosaur skull, the skull of Dromaeosaurus

A detailed assessment of archosaur interrelations by Sterling Nesbitt confirmed or found the following twelve unambiguous synapomorphies, some previously known:

- In the skull, a supratemporal fossa (excavation) is present in front of the supratemporal fenestra, the main opening in the rear skull roof
- Epipophyses, obliquely backward-pointing processes on the rear top corners of the anterior (front) neck vertebrae behind the atlas and axis, the first two neck vertebrae
- Apex of a deltopectoral crest (a projection on which the deltopectoral muscles attach) located at or more than 30% down the length of the humerus (upper arm bone)
- Radius, a lower arm bone, shorter than 80% of humerus length
- Fourth trochanter (projection where the caudofemoralis muscle attaches on the inner rear shaft) on the femur (thigh bone) is a sharp flange
- Fourth trochanter asymmetrical, with distal, lower, margin forming a steeper angle to the shaft
- On the astragalus and calcaneum, upper ankle bones, the proximal articular facet, the top connecting surface, for the fibula occupies less than 30% of the transverse width of the element
- Exoccipitals (bones at the back of the skull) do not meet along the midline on the floor of the endocranial cavity, the inner space of the braincase
- In the pelvis, the proximal articular surfaces of the ischium with the ilium and the pubis are separated by a large concave surface (on the upper side of the ischium a part of the open hip joint is located between the contacts with the pubic bone and the ilium)
- Cnemial crest on the tibia (protruding part of the top surface of the shinbone) arcs anterolaterally (curves to the front and the outer side)
- Distinct proximodistally oriented (vertical) ridge present on the posterior face of the distal end of the tibia (the rear surface of the lower end of the shinbone)
- Concave articular surface for the fibula of the calcaneum (the top surface of the calcaneum, where it touches the fibula, has a hollow profile)

Nesbitt found a number of further potential synapomorphies and discounted a number of synapomorphies previously suggested. Some of these are also present in silesaurids, which Nesbitt recovered as a sister group to Dinosauria, including a large anterior trochanter, metatarsals II and IV of subequal length, reduced contact between ischium and pubis, the presence of a cnemial crest on the tibia and of an ascending process on the astragalus, and many others.

Hip joints and hindlimb postures of: (left to right) typical reptiles (sprawling), dinosaurs and mammals (erect), and rauisuchians (pillar-erect)

A variety of other skeletal features are shared by dinosaurs. However, because they either are common to other groups of archosaurs or were not present in all early dinosaurs, these features are not synapomorphies. For example, as diapsids, dinosaurs ancestrally had two pairs of Infratemporal fenestrae (openings in the skull behind the eyes), and as members of the diapsid group Archosauria, had additional openings in the snout and lower jaw. Additionally, several characteristics once thought to be synapomorphies are now known to have appeared before dinosaurs, or were absent in the earliest dinosaurs and independently evolved by different dinosaur groups. These include an elongated scapula, or shoulder blade; a sacrum composed of three or more fused vertebrae (three are found in some other archosaurs, but only two are found in Herrerasaurus); and a perforate acetabulum, or hip socket, with a hole at the center of its inside surface (closed in Saturnalia tupiniquim, for example). Another difficulty of determining distinctly dinosaurian features is that early dinosaurs and other archosaurs from the Late Triassic epoch are often poorly known and were similar in many ways; these animals have sometimes been misidentified in the literature.

Dinosaurs stand with their hind limbs erect in a manner similar to most modern mammals, but distinct from most other reptiles, whose limbs sprawl out to either side. This posture is due to the development of a laterally facing recess in the pelvis (usually an open socket) and a corresponding inwardly facing distinct head on the femur. Their erect posture enabled early dinosaurs to breathe easily while moving, which likely permitted stamina and activity levels that surpassed those of "sprawling" reptiles. Erect limbs probably also helped support the evolution of large size by reducing bending stresses on limbs. Some non-dinosaurian archosaurs, including rauisuchians, also had erect limbs but achieved this by a "pillar-erect" configuration of the hip joint, where instead of having a projection from the femur insert on a socket on the hip, the upper pelvic bone was rotated to form an overhanging shelf.

== History of study ==
=== Pre-scientific history ===
Dinosaur fossils have been known for millennia, although their true nature was not recognized. Chinese authors have long recognised remains of prehistoric animals as "dragon bones". Huayang Guo Zhi (華陽國志), a gazetteer compiled by Chang Qu (常璩) during the Western Jin Dynasty (265–316), reported the discovery of dragon bones at Wucheng in Sichuan Province. These "dragon bones" were and still are often used as ingredients for remedies in Traditional Chinese Medicine. While these "dragon bones" have often popularly been claimed to be dinosaur bones, all known historical examples of vertebrate "dragon bones" from China are actually from Cenozoic mammals. However, a village in Henan, central China was reported in 2007 to have spent the previous several decades excavating and using real dinosaur bones as "dragon bones" for TCM purposes. In Europe, dinosaur fossils were generally thought to be the remains of giants and other biblical creatures.

=== Early dinosaur research ===
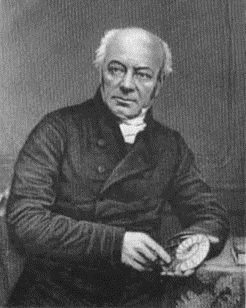
William Buckland

Scholarly descriptions of what would now be recognized as dinosaur bones first appeared in the late 17th century in England. Part of a bone, now known to have been the femur of a Megalosaurus, was recovered from a limestone quarry at Cornwell near Chipping Norton, Oxfordshire, in 1676. The fragment was sent to Robert Plot, Professor of Chemistry at the University of Oxford and first curator of the Ashmolean Museum, who published a description in his The Natural History of Oxford-shire (1677). He correctly identified the bone as the lower extremity of the femur of a large animal, and recognized that it was too large to belong to any known species. He therefore concluded it to be the femur of a huge human, perhaps a Titan or another type of giant featured in legends. Edward Lhuyd, a friend of Sir Isaac Newton, published Lithophylacii Britannici ichnographia (1699), the first scientific treatment of what would now be recognized as a dinosaur. In it he described and named a sauropod tooth, "Rutellum impicatum", that had been found in Caswell, near Witney, Oxfordshire.

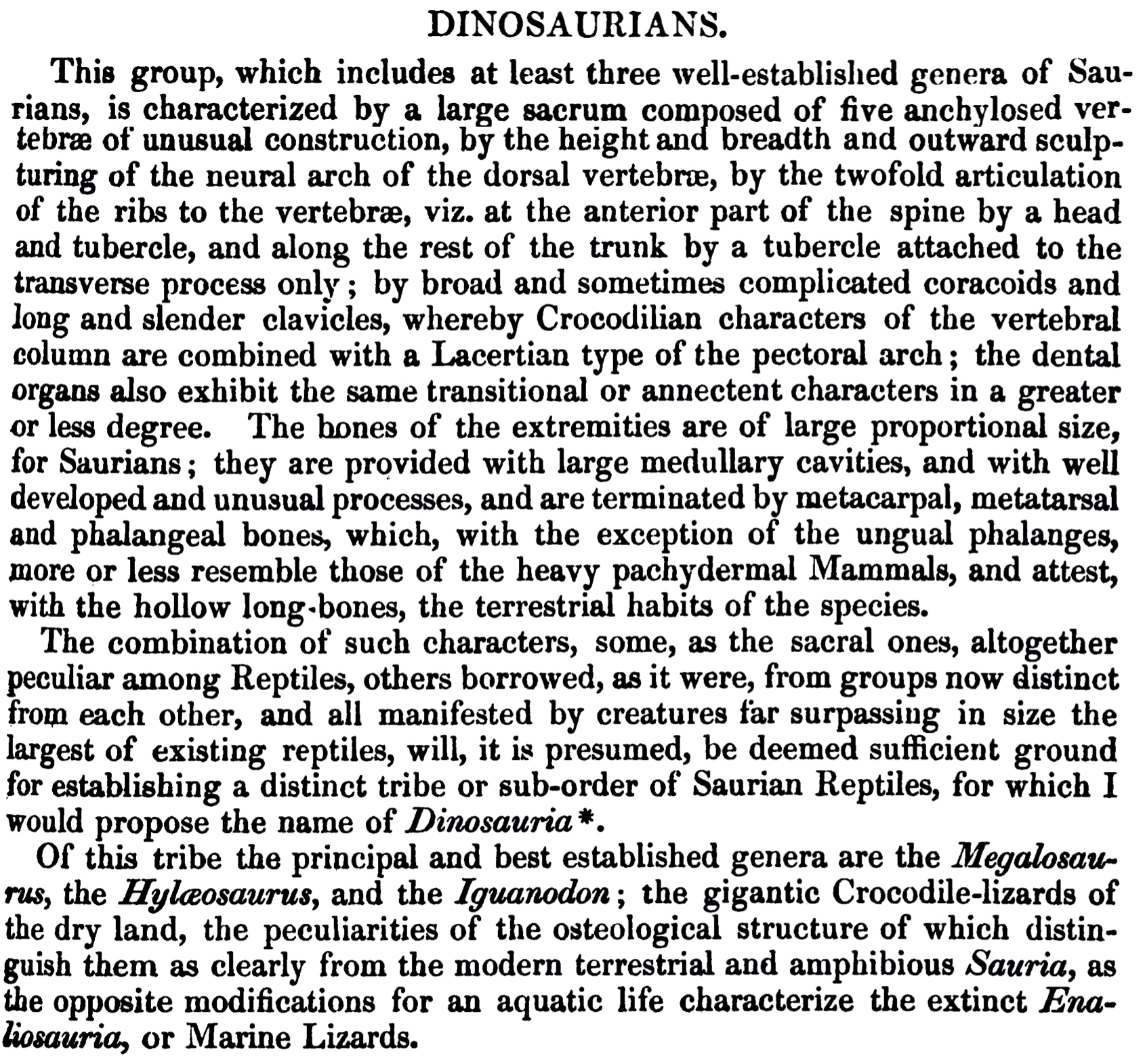
Sir Richard Owen's coining of the word dinosaur, in the 1842 revised version of his talk at an 1841 meeting of the British Association for the Advancement of Science.

Between 1815 and 1824, the Rev William Buckland, the first Reader of Geology at the University of Oxford, collected more fossilized bones of Megalosaurus and became the first person to describe a non-avian dinosaur in a scientific journal. The second non-avian dinosaur genus to be identified, Iguanodon, was purportedly discovered in 1822 by Mary Ann Mantell, the wife of English geologist Gideon Mantell, though this is disputed and some historians say Gideon had acquired remains years earlier. Gideon Mantell recognized similarities between his fossils and the bones of modern iguanas and published his findings in 1825.

The study of these "great fossil lizards" soon became of great interest to European and American scientists. Owen recognized that the remains that had been found so far, Iguanodon, Megalosaurus and Hylaeosaurus, shared distinctive features, and so decided to present them as a distinct taxonomic group. As clarified by British geologist and historian Hugh Torrens, Owen had given a presentation about fossil reptiles to the British Association for the Advancement of Science in 1841, but reports of the time show that Owen did not mention the word "dinosaur", nor recognize dinosaurs as a distinct group of reptiles in his address. He introduced the Dinosauria only in the revised text version of his talk published in April 1842. With the backing of Prince Albert, the husband of Queen Victoria, Owen established the Natural History Museum, London, to display the national collection of dinosaur fossils and other biological and geological exhibits.

=== Discoveries in North America ===
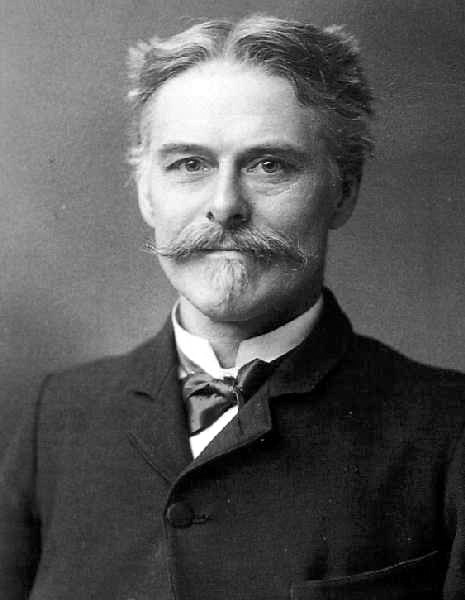
Edward Drinker Cope

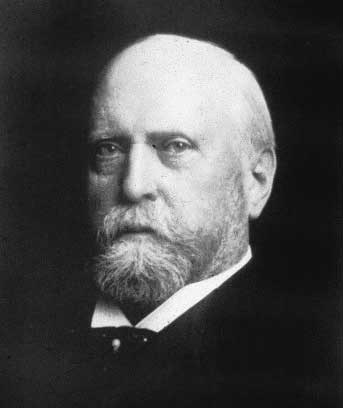
Othniel Charles Marsh

In 1858, William Parker Foulke discovered the first known American dinosaur (Note: Although fossils had been found before, their nature had not been correctly discerned.) in marl pits in the small town of Haddonfield, New Jersey. The creature was named Hadrosaurus foulkii. It was an extremely important find: Hadrosaurus was one of the first nearly complete dinosaur skeletons found (the first was in 1834, in Maidstone, England), and it was clearly a bipedal creature. This was a revolutionary discovery as, until that point, most scientists had assumed dinosaurs walked on four feet, like other lizards. Foulke's discoveries sparked a wave of interests in dinosaurs in the United States, known as Dinosaur Mania.

Dinosaur mania was exemplified by the fierce rivalry between Edward Drinker Cope and Othniel Charles Marsh, both of whom raced to be the first to find new dinosaurs in what came to be known as the Bone Wars. This fight between the two scientists lasted for over 30 years, ending in 1897 when Cope died after spending his entire fortune on the dinosaur hunt. Many valuable dinosaur specimens were damaged or destroyed due to the pair's rough methods: for example, their diggers often used dynamite to unearth bones. Modern paleontologists would find such methods crude and unacceptable, since blasting easily destroys fossil and stratigraphic evidence. Despite their unrefined methods, the contributions of Cope and Marsh to paleontology were vast: Marsh unearthed 86 new species of dinosaur and Cope discovered 56, a total of 142 new species. Cope's collection is now at the American Museum of Natural History in New York City, while Marsh's is at the Peabody Museum of Natural History at Yale University.

=== "Dinosaur renaissance" and beyond ===
World War II caused a pause in palaeontological research; after the war, research attention was also diverted increasingly to fossil mammals rather than dinosaurs, which were seen as sluggish and cold-blooded. At the end of the 1960s, however, the field of dinosaur research experienced a surge in activity that remains ongoing. Several seminal studies led to this activity. First, John Ostrom discovered the bird-like dromaeosaurid theropod Deinonychus and described it in 1969. Its anatomy indicated that it was an active predator that was likely warm-blooded, in marked contrast to the then-prevailing image of dinosaurs. Concurrently, Robert T. Bakker published a series of studies that likewise argued for active lifestyles in dinosaurs based on anatomical and ecological evidence (see § Physiology), which were subsequently summarized in his 1986 book The Dinosaur Heresies.

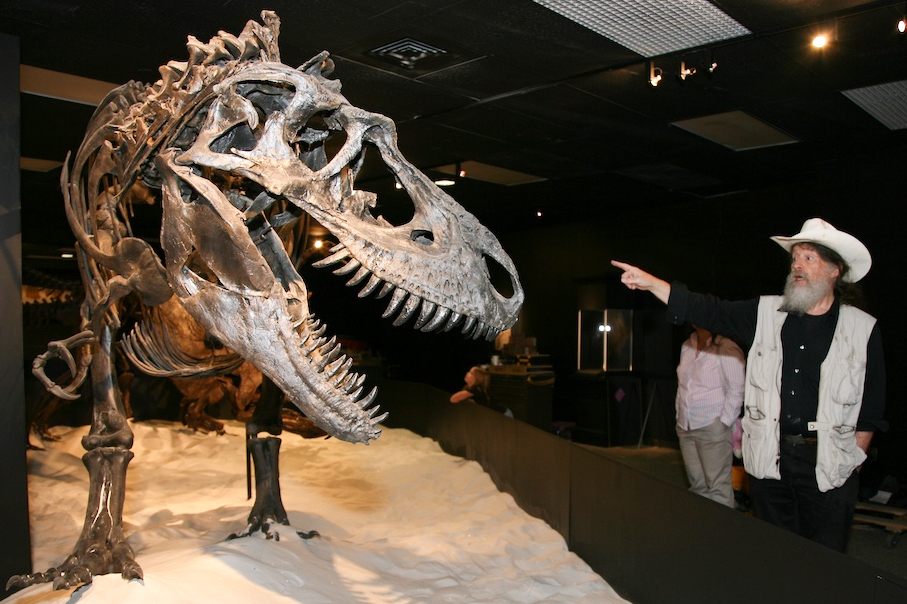
Paleontologist Robert T. Bakker with a mounted skeleton of a tyrannosaurid (Gorgosaurus libratus)

New revelations were supported by an increase in dinosaur discoveries. Major new dinosaur discoveries have been made by paleontologists working in previously unexplored regions, including India, South America, Madagascar, Antarctica, and most significantly China. Across theropods, sauropodomorphs, and ornithischians, the number of named genera began to increase drastically in the 1990s, with up to 30 new species of dinosaurs named each year by 2008. At least sauropodomorphs experienced a further increase in the number of named species in the 2010s, with an average of 9.3 new species having been named each year between 2009 and 2020. As a consequence, more sauropodomorphs were named between 1990 and 2020 than in all previous years combined. These new localities also led to improvements in overall specimen quality, with new species being increasingly named not on scrappy fossils but on more complete skeletons, sometimes from multiple individuals. Better specimens also led to new species being invalidated less frequently. Asian localities have produced the most complete theropod specimens, while North American localities have produced the most complete sauropodomorph specimens.

Prior to the dinosaur renaissance, dinosaurs were mostly classified using the traditional rank-based system of Linnaean taxonomy. The renaissance was also accompanied by the increasingly widespread application of cladistics, a more objective method of classification based on ancestry and shared traits, which has proved tremendously useful in the study of dinosaur systematics and evolution. Cladistic analysis, among other techniques, helps to compensate for an often incomplete and fragmentary fossil record. Reference books summarizing the state of dinosaur research, such as David B. Weishampel and colleagues' The Dinosauria, made knowledge more accessible and spurred further interest in dinosaur research. The release of the first and second editions of The Dinosauria in 1990 and 2004, and of a review paper by Paul Sereno in 1998, were accompanied by increases in the number of published phylogenetic trees for dinosaurs.

=== Soft tissue and molecular preservation ===
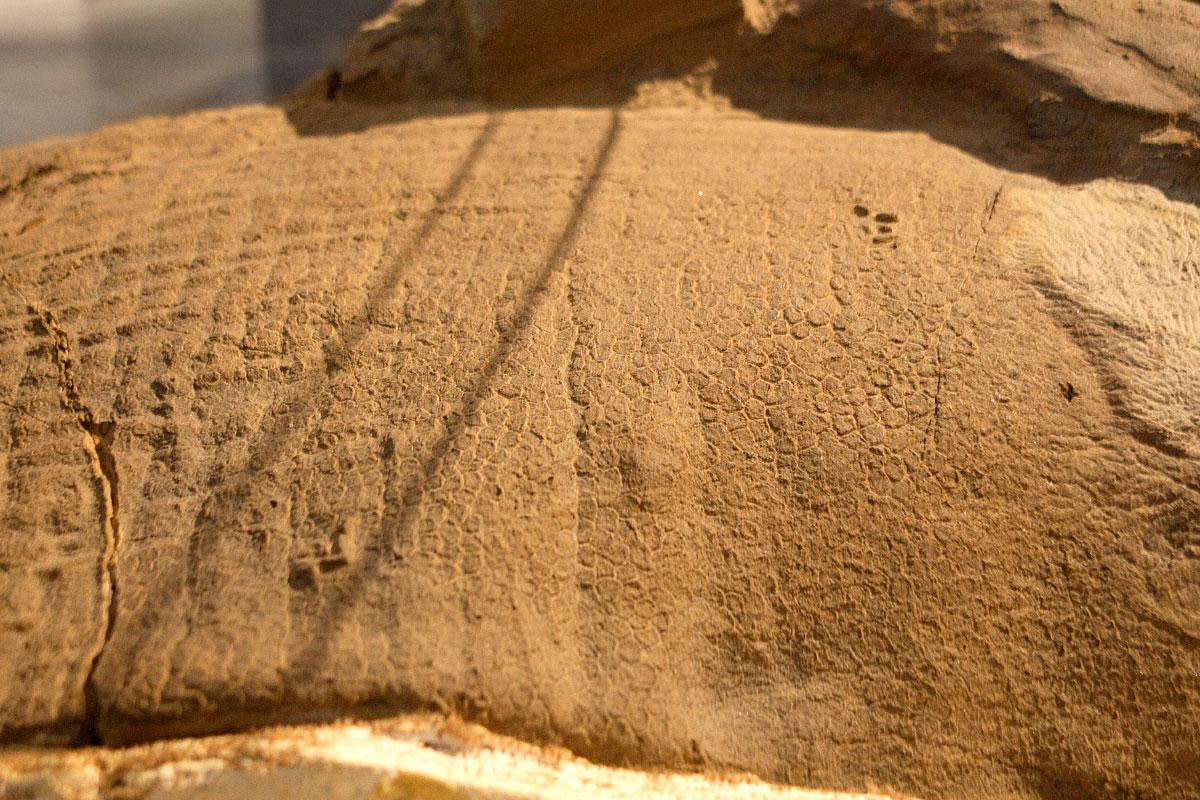
An Edmontosaurus specimen's skin impressions found in 1999

Dinosaur fossils are not limited to bones, but also include imprints or mineralized remains of skin coverings, organs, and other tissues. Of these, skin coverings based on keratin proteins are most easily preserved because of their cross-linked, hydrophobic molecular structure. Fossils of keratin-based skin coverings or bony skin coverings are known from most major groups of dinosaurs. Dinosaur fossils with scaly skin impressions have been found since the 19th century. Samuel Beckles discovered a sauropod forelimb with preserved skin in 1852 that was incorrectly attributed to a crocodile; it was correctly attributed by Marsh in 1888 and subject to further study by Reginald Hooley in 1917. Among ornithischians, in 1884 Jacob Wortman found skin impressions on the first known specimen of Edmontosaurus annectens, which were largely destroyed during the specimen's excavation. Owen and Hooley subsequently described skin impressions of Hypsilophodon and Iguanodon in 1885 and 1917. Since then, scale impressions have been most frequently found among hadrosaurids, where the impressions are known from nearly the entire body across multiple specimens.

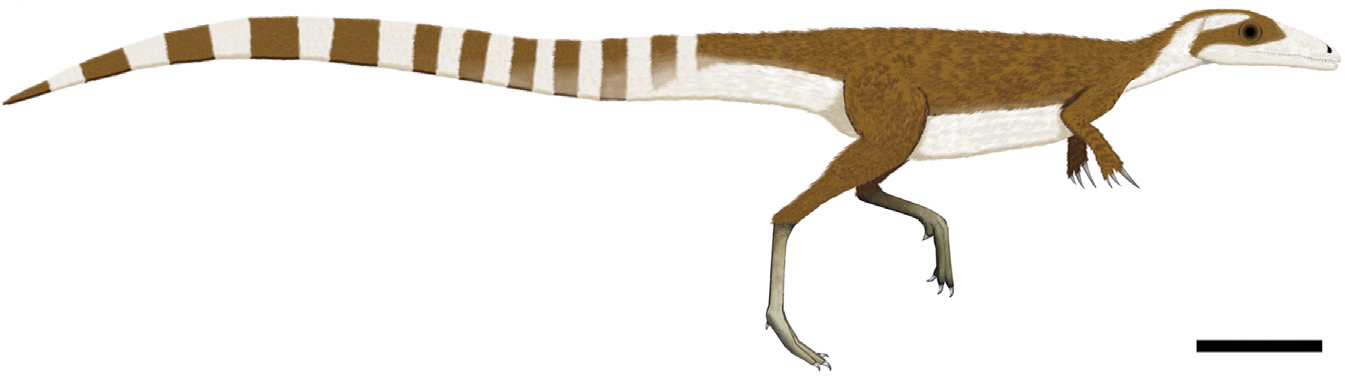
Color restoration of Sinosauropteryx

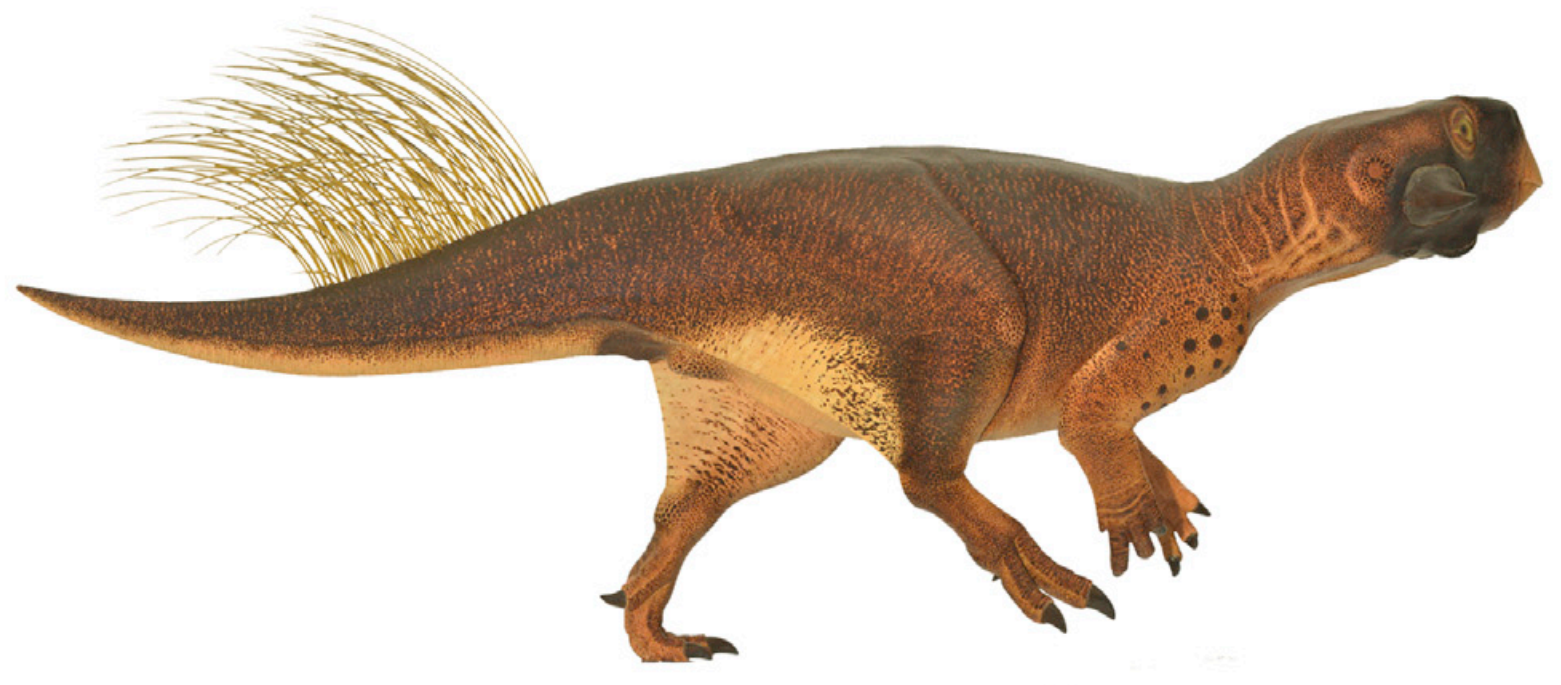
Color restoration of Psittacosaurus

Starting from the 1990s, major discoveries of exceptionally preserved fossils in deposits known as conservation Lagerstätten contributed to research on dinosaur soft tissues. Chiefly among these were the rocks that produced the Jehol (Early Cretaceous) and Yanliao (Mid-to-Late Jurassic) biotas of northeastern China, from which hundreds of dinosaur specimens bearing impressions of feather-like structures (both closely related to birds and otherwise, see § Origin of birds) have been described by Xing Xu and colleagues. In living reptiles and mammals, pigment-storing cellular structures known as melanosomes are partially responsible for producing colouration. Both chemical traces of melanin and characteristically shaped melanosomes have been reported from feathers and scales of Jehol and Yanliao dinosaurs, including both theropods and ornithischians. This has enabled multiple full-body reconstructions of dinosaur colouration, such as for Sinosauropteryx and Psittacosaurus by Jakob Vinther and colleagues, and similar techniques have also been extended to dinosaur fossils from other localities. (However, some researchers have also suggested that fossilized melanosomes represent bacterial remains.) Stomach contents in some Jehol and Yanliao dinosaurs closely related to birds have also provided indirect indications of diet and digestive system anatomy (e.g., crops). More concrete evidence of internal anatomy has been reported in Scipionyx from the Pietraroja Plattenkalk of Italy. It preserves portions of the intestines, colon, liver, muscles, and windpipe.

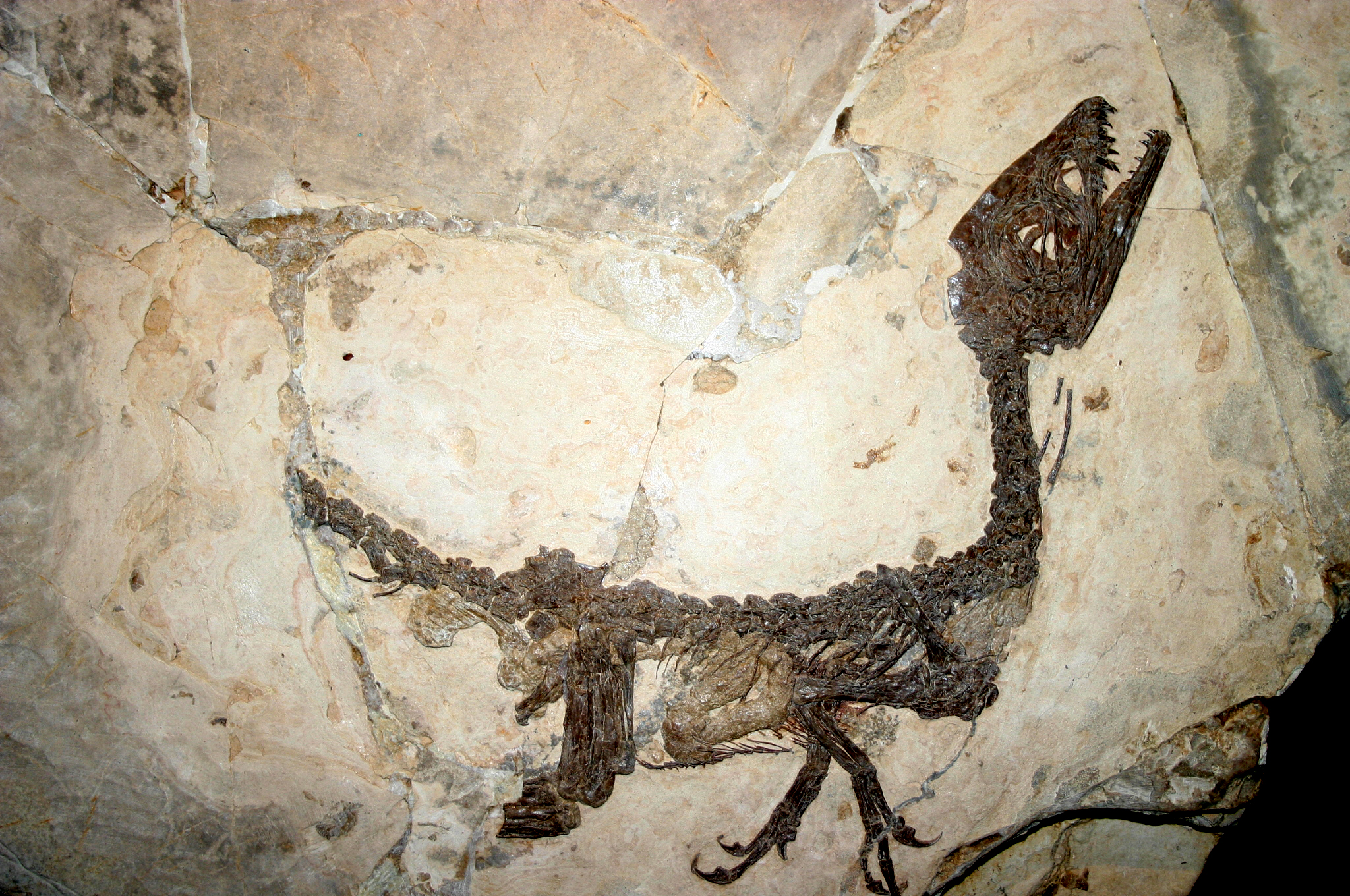
Scipionyx fossil with intestines, Natural History Museum of Milan

Concurrently, a line of work led by Mary Higby Schweitzer, Jack Horner, and colleagues reported various occurrences of preserved soft tissues and proteins within dinosaur bone fossils. Various mineralized structures that likely represented red blood cells and collagen fibres had been found by Schweitzer and others in tyrannosaurid bones as early as 1991. However, in 2005, Schweitzer and colleagues reported that a femur of Tyrannosaurus preserved soft, flexible tissue within, including blood vessels, bone matrix, and connective tissue (bone fibers) that had retained their microscopic structure. This discovery suggested that original soft tissues could be preserved over geological time, with multiple mechanisms having been proposed. Later, in 2009, Schweitzer and colleagues reported that a Brachylophosaurus femur preserved similar microstructures, and immunohistochemical techniques (based on antibody binding) demonstrated the presence of proteins such as collagen, elastin, and laminin. Both specimens yielded collagen protein sequences that were viable for molecular phylogenetic analyses, which grouped them with birds as would be expected. The extraction of fragmentary DNA has also been reported for both of these fossils, along with a specimen of Hypacrosaurus. In 2015, Sergio Bertazzo and colleagues reported the preservation of collagen fibres and red blood cells in eight Cretaceous dinosaur specimens that did not show any signs of exceptional preservation, indicating that soft tissue may be preserved more commonly than previously thought. Suggestions that these structures represent bacterial biofilms have been rejected, but cross-contamination remains a possibility that is difficult to detect.

== Evolutionary history ==
=== Origins and early evolution ===
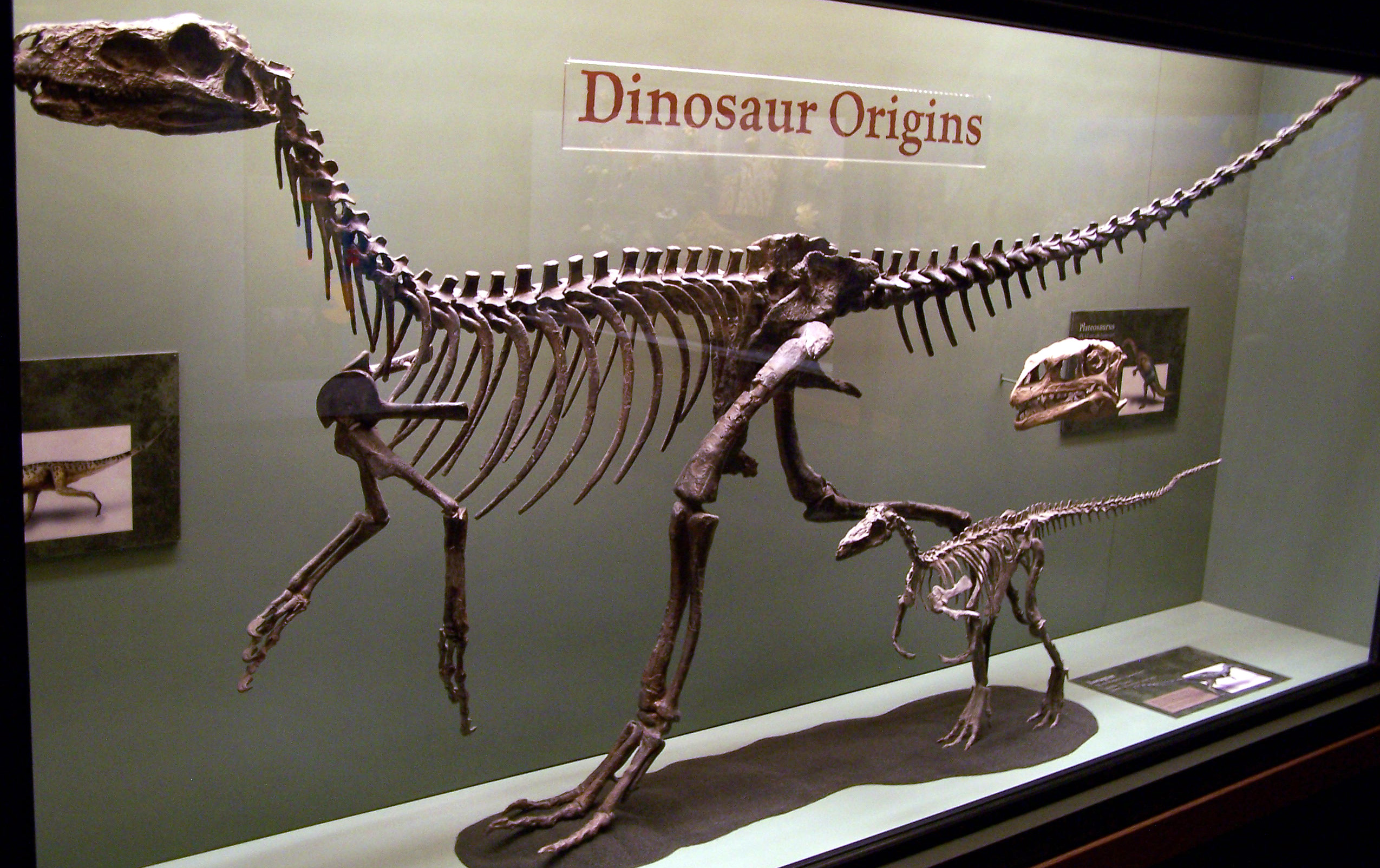
The early dinosaurs Herrerasaurus (large), Eoraptor (small) and a Plateosaurus skull, from the Triassic

Dinosaurs diverged from their archosaur ancestors during the Middle to Late Triassic epochs, roughly 20 million years after the devastating Permian–Triassic extinction event wiped out an estimated 96% of all marine species and 70% of terrestrial vertebrate species approximately 252 million years ago. The oldest dinosaur fossils known from substantial remains date to the Carnian epoch of the Triassic period and have been found primarily in the Ischigualasto and Santa Maria Formations of Argentina and Brazil, and the Pebbly Arkose Formation of Zimbabwe.

The Ischigualasto Formation (radiometrically dated at 231–230 million years old) has produced the early saurischian Eoraptor, originally considered a member of the Herrerasauridae but now considered to be an early sauropodomorph, along with the herrerasaurids Herrerasaurus and Sanjuansaurus, and the sauropodomorphs Chromogisaurus, Eodromaeus, and Panphagia. Eoraptor's likely resemblance to the common ancestor of all dinosaurs suggests that the first dinosaurs would have been small, bipedal predators. The Santa Maria Formation (radiometrically dated to be older, at 233.23 million years old) has produced the herrerasaurids Gnathovorax and Staurikosaurus, along with the sauropodomorphs Bagualosaurus, Buriolestes, Guaibasaurus, Macrocollum, Nhandumirim, Pampadromaeus, Saturnalia, and Unaysaurus. The Pebbly Arkose Formation, which is of uncertain age but was likely comparable to the other two, has produced the sauropodomorph Mbiresaurus, along with an unnamed herrerasaurid.

Less well-preserved remains of the sauropodomorphs Jaklapallisaurus and Nambalia, along with the early saurischian Alwalkeria, are known from the Upper Maleri and Lower Maleri Formations of India. The Carnian-aged Chañares Formation of Argentina preserves primitive, dinosaur-like ornithodirans such as Lagosuchus and Lagerpeton in Argentina, making it another important site for understanding dinosaur evolution. These ornithodirans support the model of early dinosaurs as small, bipedal predators. Dinosaurs may have appeared as early as the Anisian epoch of the Triassic, approximately 243 million years ago, which is the age of Nyasasaurus from the Manda Formation of Tanzania. However, its known fossils are too fragmentary to identify it as a dinosaur or only a close relative. The referral of the Manda Formation to the Anisian is also uncertain. Regardless, dinosaurs existed alongside non-dinosaurian ornithodirans for a period of time, with estimates ranging from 5–10 million years to 21 million years.

When dinosaurs appeared, they were not the dominant terrestrial animals. The terrestrial habitats were occupied by various types of archosauromorphs and therapsids, like cynodonts and rhynchosaurs. Their main competitors were the pseudosuchians, such as aetosaurs, ornithosuchids and rauisuchians, which were more successful than the dinosaurs. Most of these other animals became extinct in the Triassic, in one of two events. First, at about 215 million years ago, a variety of basal archosauromorphs, including the protorosaurs, became extinct. This was followed by the Triassic–Jurassic extinction event (about 201 million years ago), that saw the end of most of the other groups of early archosaurs, like aetosaurs, ornithosuchids, phytosaurs, and rauisuchians. Rhynchosaurs and dicynodonts survived (at least in some areas) at least as late as early –mid Norian and late Norian or earliest Rhaetian stages, respectively, and the exact date of their extinction is uncertain. These losses left behind a land fauna of crocodylomorphs, dinosaurs, mammals, pterosaurians, and turtles. The first few lines of early dinosaurs diversified through the Carnian and Norian stages of the Triassic, possibly by occupying the niches of the groups that became extinct. Also notably, there was a heightened rate of extinction during the Carnian pluvial event.

=== Evolution and paleobiogeography ===
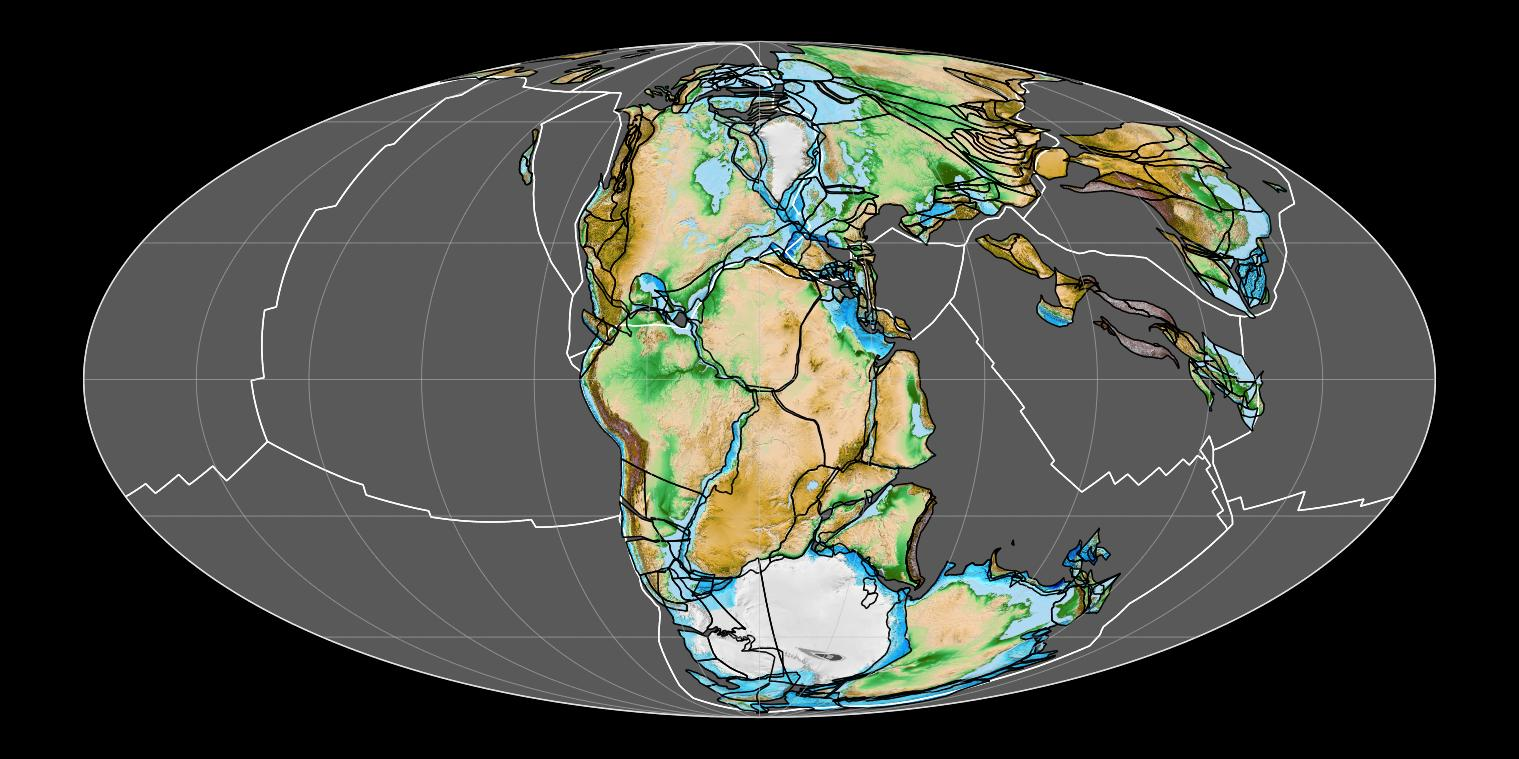
The supercontinent Pangaea in the early Mesozoic (around 200 million years ago)

Dinosaur evolution after the Triassic followed changes in vegetation and the location of continents. In the Late Triassic and Early Jurassic, the continents were connected as the single landmass Pangaea, and there was a worldwide dinosaur fauna mostly composed of coelophysoid carnivores and early sauropodomorph herbivores. Gymnosperm plants (particularly conifers), a potential food source, radiated in the Late Triassic. Early sauropodomorphs did not have sophisticated mechanisms for processing food in the mouth, and so must have employed other means of breaking down food farther along the digestive tract. The general homogeneity of dinosaurian faunas continued into the Middle and Late Jurassic, where most localities had predators consisting of ceratosaurians, megalosauroids, and allosauroids, and herbivores consisting of stegosaurian ornithischians and large sauropods. Examples of this include the Morrison Formation of North America and Tendaguru Beds of Tanzania. Dinosaurs in China show some differences, with specialized metriacanthosaurid theropods and unusual, long-necked sauropods like Mamenchisaurus. Ankylosaurians and ornithopods were also becoming more common, but primitive sauropodomorphs had become extinct. Conifers and pteridophytes were the most common plants. Sauropods, like earlier sauropodomorphs, were not oral processors, but ornithischians were evolving various means of dealing with food in the mouth, including potential cheek-like organs to keep food in the mouth, and jaw motions to grind food. Another notable evolutionary event of the Jurassic was the appearance of true birds, descended from maniraptoran coelurosaurians.

By the Early Cretaceous and the ongoing breakup of Pangaea, dinosaurs were becoming strongly differentiated by landmass. The earliest part of this time saw the spread of ankylosaurians, iguanodontians, and brachiosaurids through Europe, North America, and northern Africa. These were later supplemented or replaced in Africa by large spinosaurid and carcharodontosaurid theropods, and rebbachisaurid and titanosaurian sauropods, also found in South America. In Asia, maniraptoran coelurosaurians like dromaeosaurids, troodontids, and oviraptorosaurians became the common theropods, and ankylosaurids and early ceratopsians like Psittacosaurus became important herbivores. Meanwhile, Australia was home to a fauna of basal ankylosaurians, titanosaurian sauropods and large and small Elasmarian ornithopods. The stegosaurians appear to have gone extinct at some point in the late Early Cretaceous or early Late Cretaceous. A major change in the Early Cretaceous, which would be amplified in the Late Cretaceous, was the evolution of flowering plants. At the same time, several groups of dinosaurian herbivores evolved more sophisticated ways to orally process food. Ceratopsians developed a method of slicing with teeth stacked on each other in batteries, and iguanodontians refined a method of grinding with dental batteries, taken to its extreme in hadrosaurids. Some sauropods also evolved tooth batteries, best exemplified by the rebbachisaurid Nigersaurus.

There were three general dinosaur faunas in the Late Cretaceous. In the northern continents of North America and Asia, the major theropods were tyrannosaurids and various types of smaller maniraptoran theropods, with a predominantly ornithischian herbivore assemblage of hadrosaurids, ceratopsians, ankylosaurids, and pachycephalosaurians. In the southern continents that had made up the now-splitting supercontinent Gondwana, abelisaurids were the common theropods, and titanosaurian sauropods the common herbivores. Finally, in Europe, dromaeosaurids, rhabdodontid iguanodontians, nodosaurid ankylosaurians, and titanosaurian sauropods were prevalent. Flowering plants were greatly radiating, with the first grasses appearing by the end of the Cretaceous. Grinding hadrosaurids and shearing ceratopsians became very diverse across North America and Asia. Theropods were also radiating as herbivores or omnivores, with therizinosaurians and ornithomimosaurians becoming common.

The Cretaceous–Paleogene extinction event, which occurred approximately 66 million years ago at the end of the Cretaceous, caused the extinction of all dinosaur groups except for the neornithine birds. Some other diapsid groups, including crocodilians, dyrosaurs, sebecosuchians, turtles, lizards, snakes, sphenodontians, and choristoderans, also survived the event.

The surviving lineages of neornithine birds, including the ancestors of modern ratites, ducks and chickens, and a variety of waterbirds, diversified rapidly at the beginning of the Paleogene period, entering ecological niches left vacant by the extinction of Mesozoic dinosaur groups such as the arboreal enantiornithines, aquatic hesperornithines, and even the larger terrestrial theropods (in the form of Gastornis, eogruiids, bathornithids, ratites, geranoidids, mihirungs, and "terror birds"). It is often stated that mammals out-competed the neornithines for dominance of most terrestrial niches but many of these groups co-existed with rich mammalian faunas for most of the Cenozoic Era. Terror birds and bathornithids occupied carnivorous guilds alongside predatory mammals, and ratites are still fairly successful as midsized herbivores; eogruiids similarly lasted from the Eocene to Pliocene, becoming extinct only very recently after over 20 million years of co-existence with many mammal groups.

== Classification ==
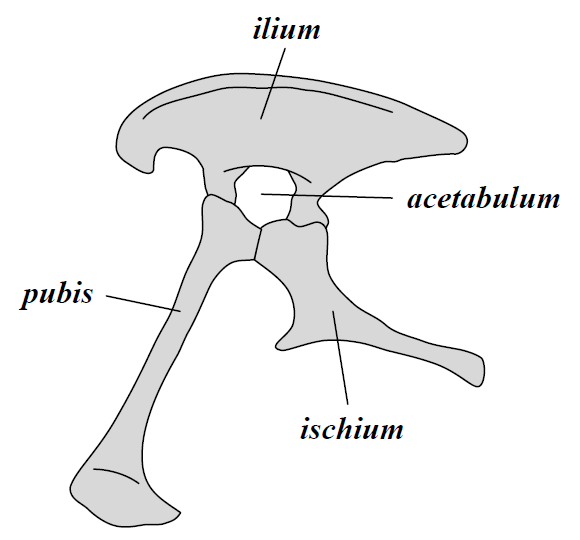
Saurischian pelvis structure (left side)

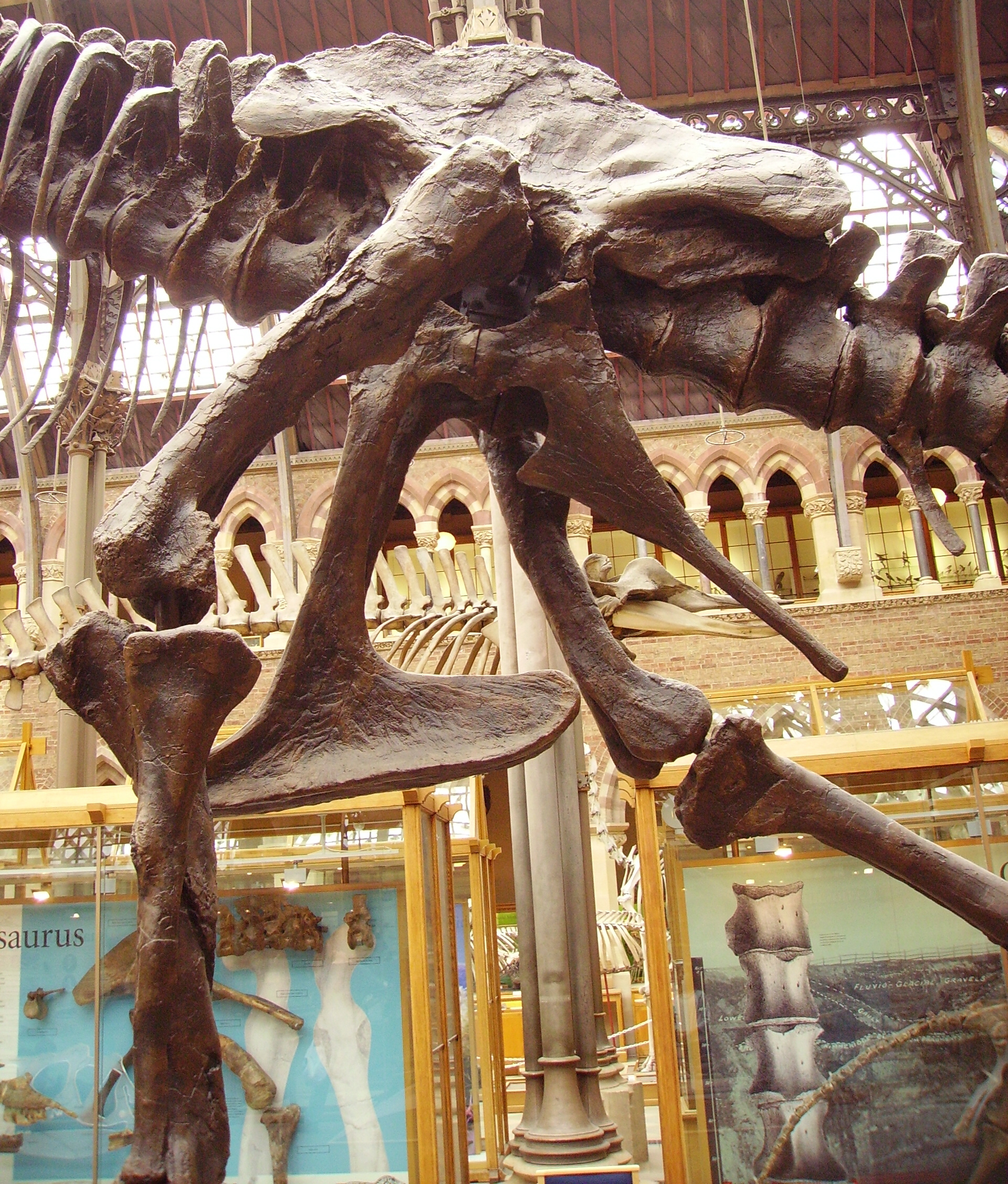
Tyrannosaurus pelvis (showing saurischian structure – left side)

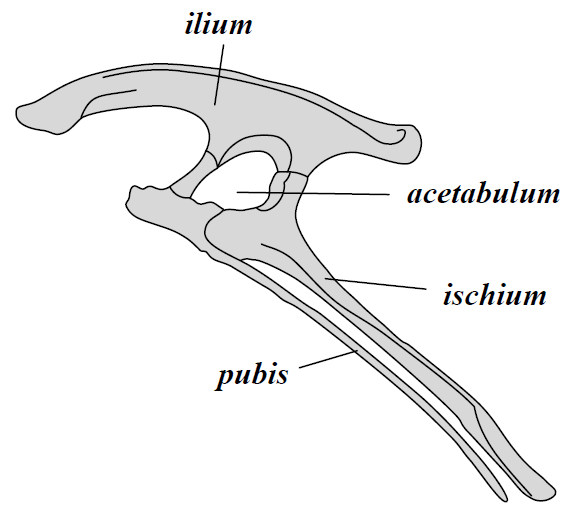
Ornithischian pelvis structure (left side)

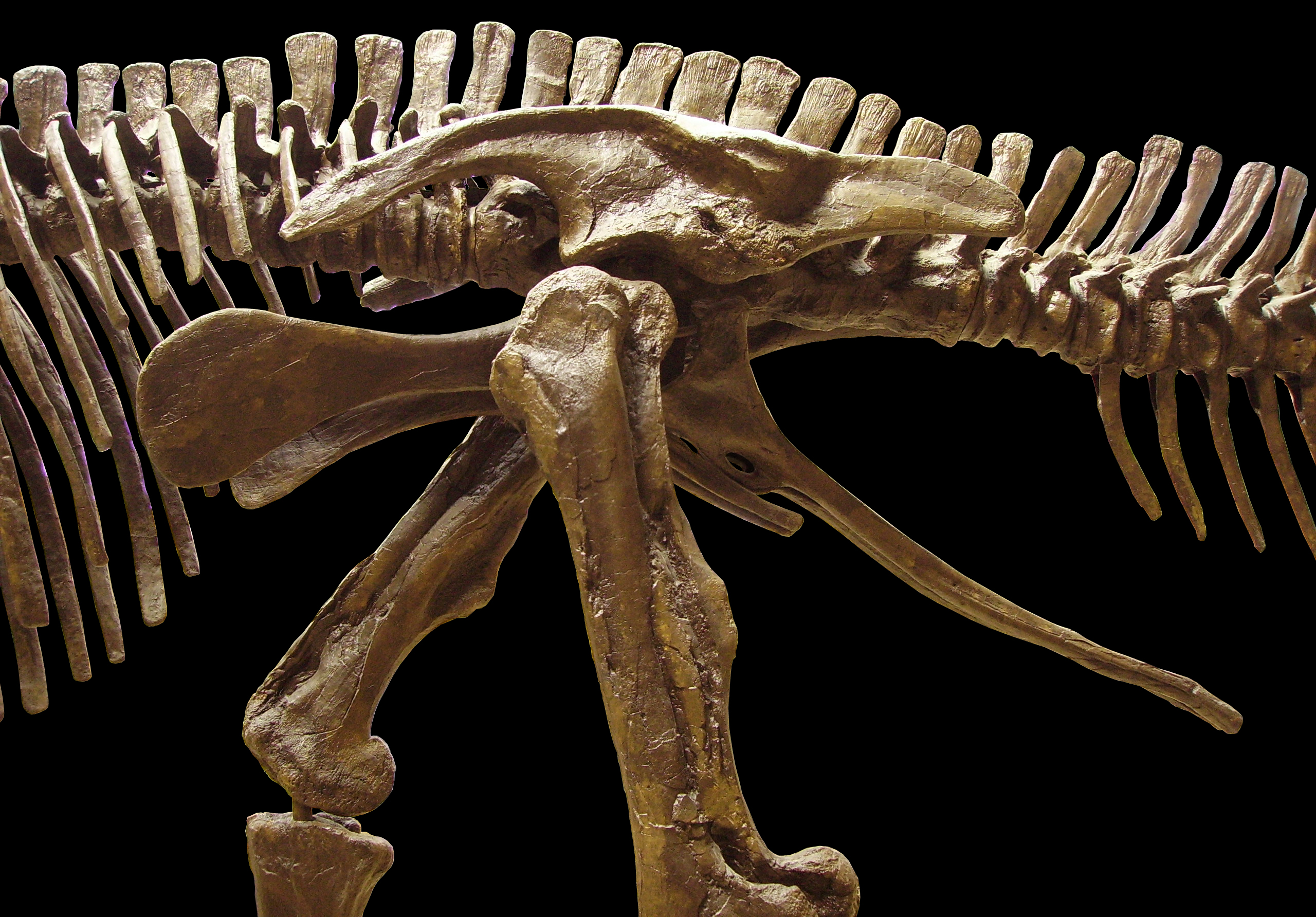
Edmontosaurus pelvis (showing ornithischian structure – left side)

Dinosaurs belong to a group known as archosaurs, which also includes modern crocodilians. Within the archosaur group, dinosaurs are differentiated most noticeably by their gait. Dinosaur legs extend directly beneath the body, whereas the legs of lizards and crocodilians sprawl out to either side.

Collectively, dinosaurs as a clade are divided into two primary branches, Saurischia and Ornithischia. Saurischia includes those taxa sharing a more recent common ancestor with birds than with Ornithischia, while Ornithischia includes all taxa sharing a more recent common ancestor with Triceratops than with Saurischia. Anatomically, these two groups can be distinguished most noticeably by their pelvic structure. Early saurischians—"lizard-hipped", from the Greek sauros (σαῦρος) meaning "lizard" and ischion (ἰσχίον) meaning "hip joint"—retained the hip structure of their ancestors, with a pubis bone directed cranially, or forward. This basic form was modified by rotating the pubis backward to varying degrees in several groups (Herrerasaurus, therizinosauroids, dromaeosaurids, and birds). Saurischia includes the theropods (exclusively bipedal and with a wide variety of diets) and sauropodomorphs (long-necked herbivores which include advanced, quadrupedal groups).

By contrast, ornithischians—"bird-hipped", from the Greek ornis (ὀρνίς) meaning "bird" and ischion (ἰσχίον) meaning "hip joint"—had a pelvis that superficially resembled a bird's pelvis: the pubic bone was oriented caudally (rear-pointing). Unlike birds, the ornithischian pubis also usually had an additional forward-pointing process. Ornithischia includes a variety of species that were primarily herbivores.

Despite the terms "bird hip" (Ornithischia) and "lizard hip" (Saurischia), birds are not part of Ornithischia. Birds instead belong to Saurischia, the "lizard-hipped" dinosaurs—birds evolved from earlier dinosaurs with "lizard hips".

The following cladogram showing the relationships of dinosaur groups is simplified after Michael Benton, 2015:

- Dinosauria
  - Saurischia
    - Herrerasauridae
    - - Theropoda
        - Coelophysoidea
        - - Ceratosauria
          - Tetanurae
            - Megalosauroidea
            - - Allosauroidea
              - Coelurosauria
                - Tyrannosauroidea
                - - Compsognathidae
                  - - Ornithomimidae
                    - Maniraptora
                      ⊞ (including birds)
                      ⊟
                      - Alvarezsauridae
                      - - Therizinosauridae
                        - - Oviraptorosauria
                          - Paraves
                            - Deinonychosauria
                            - Aves (birds)
      - Sauropodomorpha
        - Plateosauridae
        - - Riojasauridae
          - - Massospondylidae
            - Sauropoda
              - Vulcanodontidae
              - - Mamenchisauridae
                - Neosauropoda
                  - Diplodocoidea
                  - Macronaria
                    ⊞
                    ⊟
                    - Camarasauridae
                    - - Brachiosauridae
                      - Titanosauria
  - Ornithischia
    - Heterodontosauridae
    - - Thyreophora
        - Stegosauria
        - Ankylosauria
      - Cerapoda
        - Marginocephalia
          - Pachycephalosauria
          - Ceratopsia
        - Ornithopoda
          - Iguanodon
          - Hadrosauridae

== Paleobiology ==
Knowledge about dinosaurs is derived from a variety of fossil and non-fossil records, including fossilized bones, feces, trackways, gastroliths, feathers, impressions of skin, internal organs and other soft tissues. Many fields of study contribute to our understanding of dinosaurs, including physics (especially biomechanics), chemistry, biology, and the Earth sciences (of which paleontology is a sub-discipline). Two topics of particular interest and study have been dinosaur size and behavior.

=== Size ===
Scale diagram comparing the average human to the longest known dinosaurs in five major clades: Sauropoda (Supersaurus vivianae) Ornithopoda (Shantungosaurus giganteus) Theropoda (Spinosaurus aegyptiacus) Thyreophora (Stegosaurus ungulatus) Marginocephalia (Triceratops prorsus)

Current evidence suggests that dinosaur average size varied through the Triassic, Early Jurassic, Late Jurassic and Cretaceous. Predatory theropod dinosaurs, which occupied most terrestrial carnivore niches during the Mesozoic, most often fall into the 100-to-1,000 kg (220-to-2,200 lb) category when sorted by estimated weight into categories based on order of magnitude, whereas recent predatory carnivoran mammals peak in the 10-to-100 kg (22-to-220 lb) category. The mode of Mesozoic dinosaur body masses is between 1 and 10 metric tons (1.1 and 11.0 short tons). This contrasts sharply with the average size of Cenozoic mammals, estimated by the National Museum of Natural History as about 2 to 5 kg (4.4 to 11.0 lb).

The sauropods were the largest and heaviest dinosaurs. For much of the dinosaur era, the smallest sauropods were larger than anything else in their habitat, and the largest was an order of magnitude more massive than anything else that has since walked the Earth. Giant prehistoric mammals such as Paraceratherium (the largest land mammal ever) were dwarfed by the giant sauropods, and only modern whales approach or surpass them in size. There are several proposed advantages for the large size of sauropods, including protection from predation, reduction of energy use, and longevity, but it may be that the most important advantage was dietary. Large animals are more efficient at digestion than small animals, because food spends more time in their digestive systems. This also permits them to subsist on food with lower nutritive value than smaller animals. Sauropod remains are mostly found in rock formations interpreted as dry or seasonally dry, and the ability to eat large quantities of low-nutrient browse would have been advantageous in such environments.

==== Largest and smallest ====
Scientists will probably never be certain of the largest and smallest dinosaurs to have ever existed. This is because only a tiny percentage of animals were ever fossilized and most of these remain buried in the earth. Few non-avian dinosaur specimens that are recovered are complete skeletons, and impressions of skin and other soft tissues are rare. Rebuilding a complete skeleton by comparing the size and morphology of bones to those of similar, better-known species is an inexact art, and reconstructing the muscles and other organs of the living animal is, at best, a process of educated guesswork.

Comparative size of Argentinosaurus to the average human

The tallest and heaviest dinosaur known from good skeletons is Giraffatitan brancai (previously classified as a species of Brachiosaurus). Its remains were discovered in Tanzania between 1907 and 1912. Bones from several similar-sized individuals were incorporated into the skeleton now mounted and on display at the Museum für Naturkunde in Berlin; this mount is 12 meters (39 ft) tall and 21.8 to 22.5 meters (72 to 74 ft) long, and would have belonged to an animal that weighed between 30000 and 60000 kilograms (70000 and 130000 lb). The longest complete dinosaur is the 27 meters (89 ft) long Diplodocus, which was discovered in Wyoming in the United States and displayed in Pittsburgh's Carnegie Museum of Natural History in 1907. The longest dinosaur known from good fossil material is Patagotitan: the skeleton mount in the American Museum of Natural History in New York is 37 meters (121 ft) long. The Museo Municipal Carmen Funes in Plaza Huincul, Argentina, has an Argentinosaurus reconstructed skeleton mount that is 39.7 meters (130 ft) long.

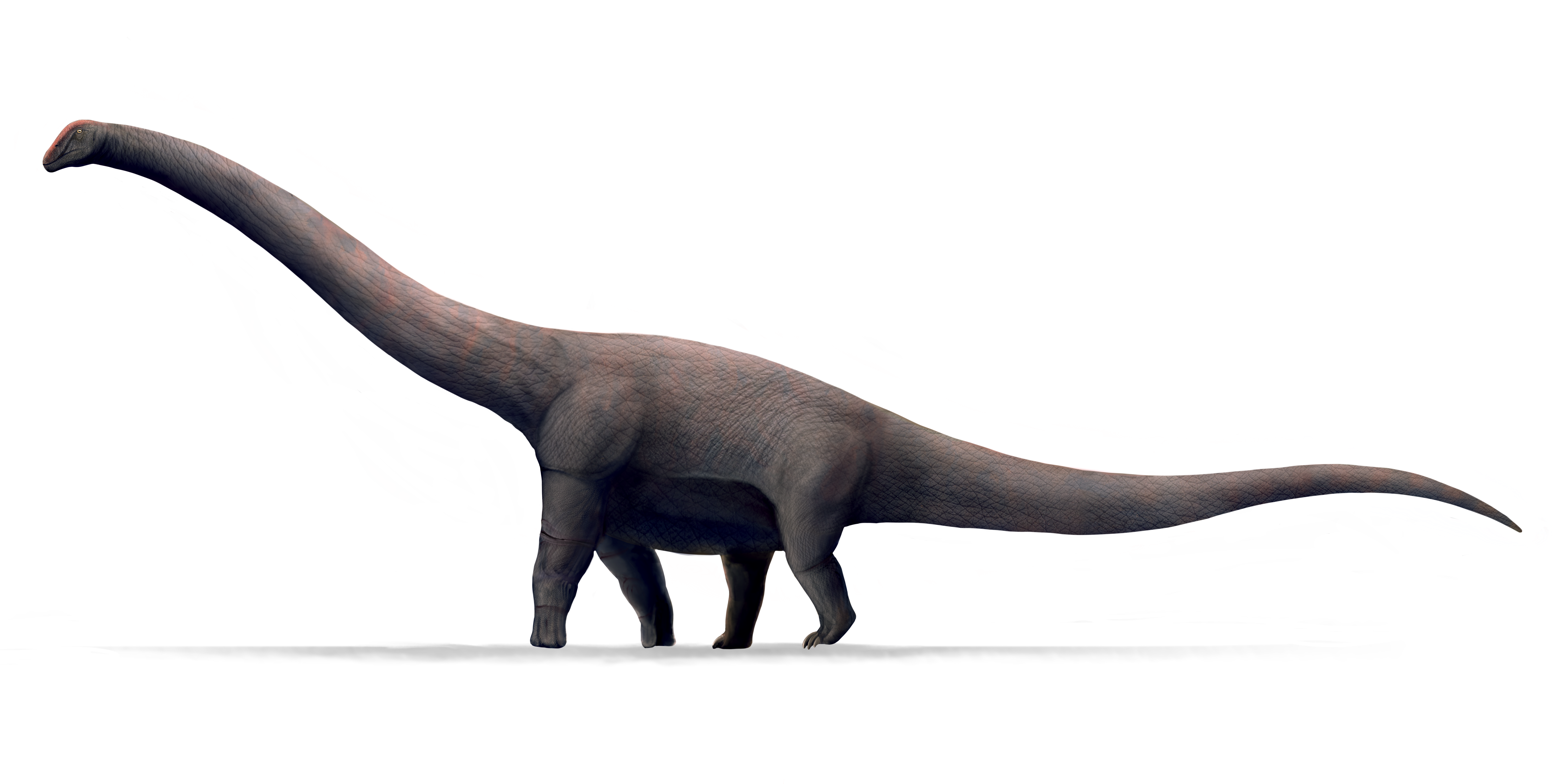
Bruhathkayosaurus, potentially the largest terrestrial animal to ever exist

There were larger dinosaurs, but knowledge of them is based entirely on a small number of fragmentary fossils. Most of the largest herbivorous specimens on record were discovered in the 1970s or later, and include the massive Argentinosaurus, which may have weighed 80000 to 100000 kilograms (88 to 110 short tons) and reached lengths of 30 to 40 meters (98 to 131 ft); some of the longest were the 33.5-meter (110 ft) long Diplodocus hallorum (formerly Seismosaurus), the 33-to-34-meter (108 to 112 ft) long Supersaurus, and 37-meter (121 ft) long Patagotitan; and the tallest, the 18-meter (59 ft) tall Sauroposeidon, which could have reached a sixth-floor window. There were a few dinosaurs that were considered either the heaviest or longest. The most famous include Amphicoelias fragillimus, known only from a now lost partial vertebral neural arch described in 1878. Extrapolating from the illustration of this bone, the animal may have been 58 meters (190 ft) long and weighed 122400 kg (269800 lb). However, recent research has reclassified Amphicoelias from the long, gracile diplodocid to the shorter but much stockier rebbachisaurid. Now renamed as Maraapunisaurus, this sauropod measured as much as 40 meters (130 ft) long and weighed as much as 120000 kg (260000 lb). Another contender of this title includes Bruhathkayosaurus, a controversial taxon that was recently confirmed to exist after archived photos were uncovered. Bruhathkayosaurus was a titanosaur and would have most likely weighed more than even Maraapunisaurus. Recent size estimates in 2023 have this sauropod reaching lengths of up to 44 m (144 ft) long and placed in a colossal weight range of around 110000–170000 kg (240000–370000 lb). If these upper estimates are true, Bruhathkayosaurus would have rivaled the blue whale and Perucetus colossus as one of the largest animals to have ever existed.

The largest carnivorous dinosaur was Spinosaurus, reaching a length of 12.6 to 18 meters (41 to 59 ft) and weighing 7 to 20.9 metric tons (7.7 to 23.0 short tons). Other large carnivorous theropods included Giganotosaurus, Carcharodontosaurus, and Tyrannosaurus. Therizinosaurus and Deinocheirus were among the tallest of the theropods. The largest ornithischian dinosaur was probably the hadrosaurid Shantungosaurus giganteus, which measured 16.6 meters (54 ft). The largest individuals may have weighed as much as 16 metric tons (18 short tons).

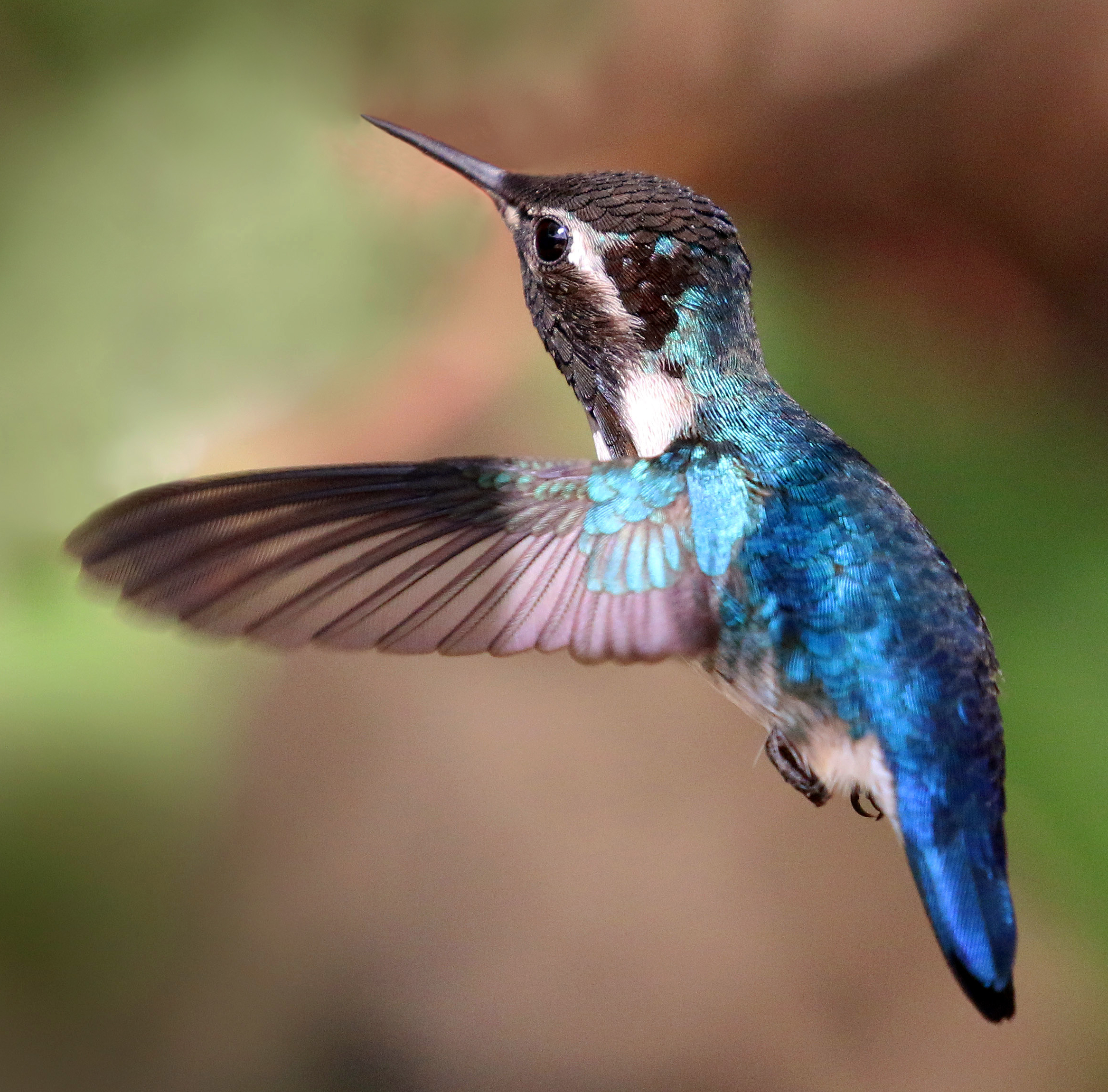
An adult bee hummingbird, the smallest known dinosaur

The smallest dinosaur known is the bee hummingbird, with a length of only 5 centimeters (2.0 in) and mass of around 1.8 g (0.063 oz). The smallest known non-avialan dinosaurs were about the size of pigeons and were those theropods most closely related to birds. For example, Anchiornis huxleyi is currently the smallest non-avialan dinosaur described from an adult specimen, with an estimated weight of 110 g (3.9 oz) and a total skeletal length of 34 centimeters (1.12 ft). The smallest herbivorous non-avialan dinosaurs included Microceratus and Wannanosaurus, at about 60 centimeters (2.0 ft) long each.

=== Behavior ===
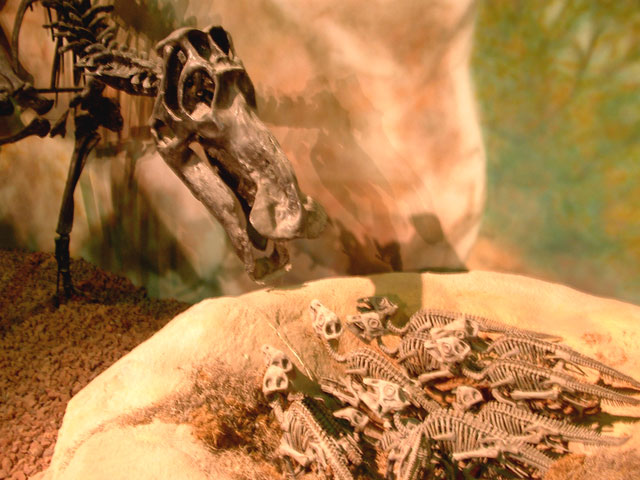
A nesting ground of the hadrosaur Maiasaura peeblesorum was discovered in 1978

Many modern birds are highly social, often found living in flocks. There is general agreement that some behaviors that are common in birds, as well as in crocodilians (closest living relatives of birds), were also common among extinct dinosaur groups. Interpretations of behavior in fossil species are generally based on the pose of skeletons and their habitat, computer simulations of their biomechanics, and comparisons with modern animals in similar ecological niches.

The first potential evidence for herding or flocking as a widespread behavior common to many dinosaur groups in addition to birds was the 1878 discovery of 31 Iguanodon, ornithischians that were then thought to have perished together in Bernissart, Belgium, after they fell into a deep, flooded sinkhole and drowned. Other mass-death sites have been discovered subsequently. Those, along with multiple trackways, suggest that gregarious behavior was common in many early dinosaur species. Trackways of hundreds or even thousands of herbivores indicate that duck-billed (hadrosaurids) may have moved in great herds, like the American bison or the African springbok. Sauropod tracks document that these animals traveled in groups composed of several different species, at least in Oxfordshire, England, although there is no evidence for specific herd structures. Congregating into herds may have evolved for defense, for migratory purposes, or to provide protection for young. There is evidence that many types of slow-growing dinosaurs, including various theropods, sauropods, ankylosaurians, ornithopods, and ceratopsians, formed aggregations of immature individuals. One example is a site in Inner Mongolia that has yielded remains of over 20 Sinornithomimus, from one to seven years old. This assemblage is interpreted as a social group that was trapped in mud. The interpretation of dinosaurs as gregarious has also extended to depicting carnivorous theropods as pack hunters working together to bring down large prey. However, this lifestyle is uncommon among modern birds, crocodiles, and other reptiles (though it is not unknown as frequently assumed, and is also uncommon in mammals), and the taphonomic evidence suggesting cooperative hunting in such theropods as Deinonychus and Allosaurus can also be interpreted as the results of fatal disputes between feeding animals.

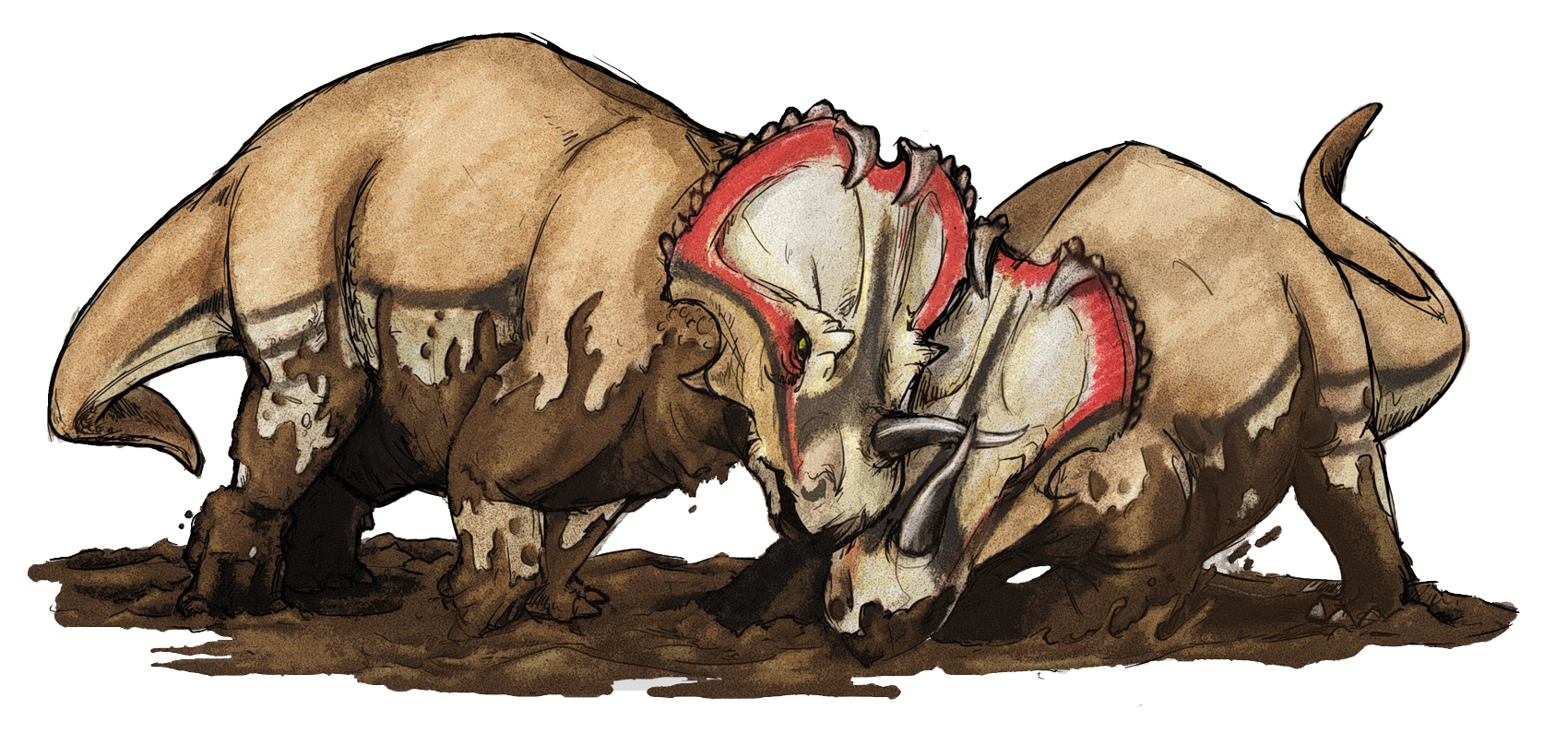
Restoration of two Centrosaurus apertus engaged in intra-specific combat

The crests and frills of some dinosaurs, like the marginocephalians, theropods and lambeosaurines, may have been too fragile to be used for active defense, and so they were likely used for sexual or aggressive displays, though little is known about dinosaur mating and territorialism. Head wounds from bites suggest that theropods, at least, engaged in active aggressive confrontations.

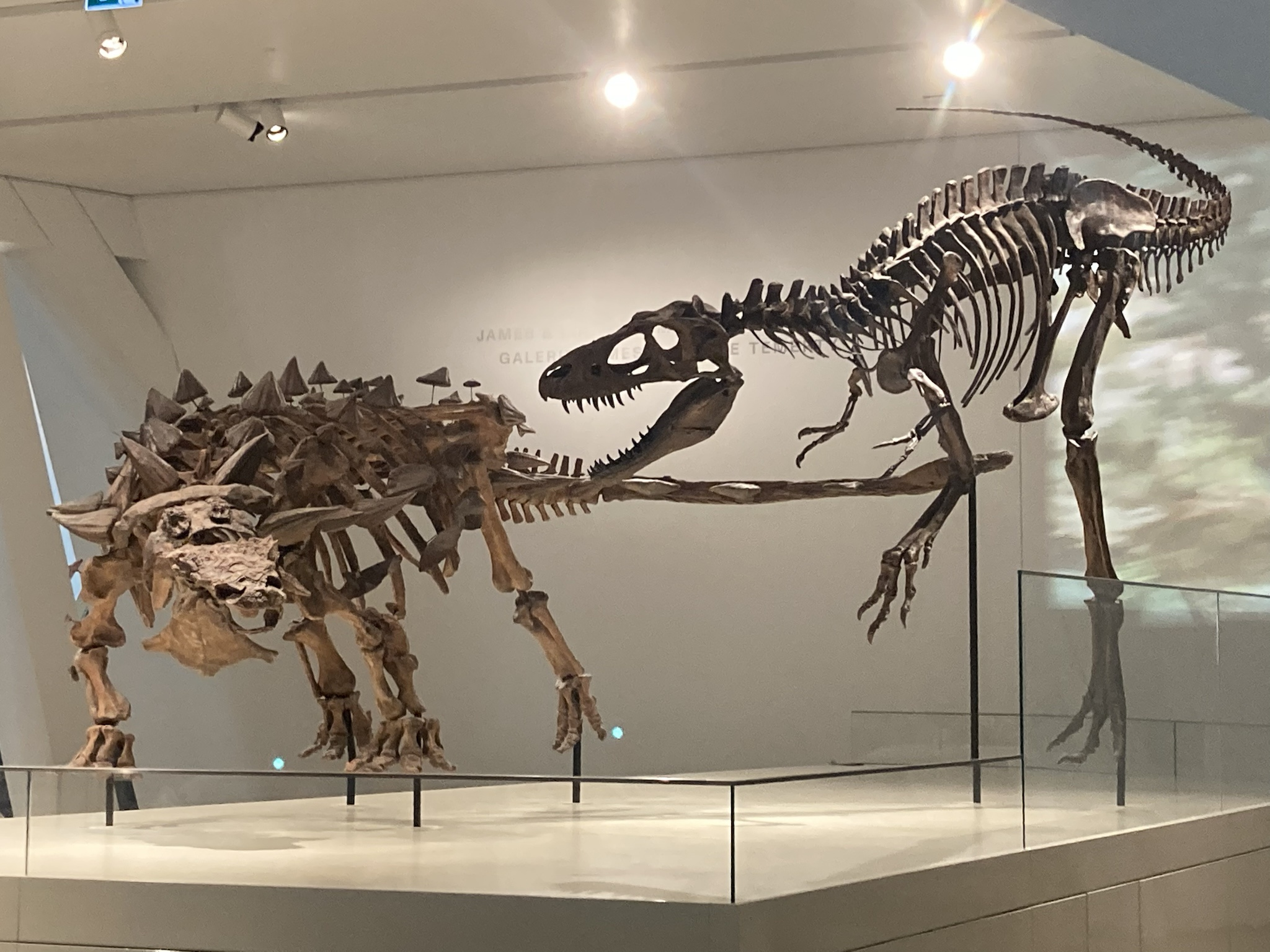
Mount of a Gorgosaurus, a carnivorous theropod, attacking a herbivorous Zuul

From a behavioral standpoint, one of the most valuable dinosaur fossils was discovered in the Gobi Desert in 1971. It included a Velociraptor attacking a Protoceratops, providing evidence that dinosaurs did indeed attack each other. Additional evidence for attacking live prey is the partially healed tail of an Edmontosaurus, a hadrosaurid dinosaur; the tail is damaged in such a way that shows the animal was bitten by a tyrannosaur but survived. Cannibalism amongst some species of dinosaurs was confirmed by tooth marks found in Madagascar in 2003, involving the theropod Majungasaurus.

Comparisons between the scleral rings of dinosaurs and modern birds and reptiles have been used to infer daily activity patterns of dinosaurs. Although it has been suggested that most dinosaurs were active during the day, these comparisons have shown that small predatory dinosaurs such as dromaeosaurids, Juravenator, and Megapnosaurus were likely nocturnal. Large and medium-sized herbivorous and omnivorous dinosaurs such as ceratopsians, sauropodomorphs, hadrosaurids, ornithomimosaurs may have been cathemeral, active during short intervals throughout the day, although the small ornithischian Agilisaurus was inferred to be diurnal.

Based on fossil evidence from dinosaurs such as Oryctodromeus, some ornithischian species seem to have led a partially fossorial (burrowing) lifestyle. Many modern birds are arboreal (tree climbing), and this was also true of many Mesozoic birds, especially the enantiornithines. While some early bird-like species may have already been arboreal as well (including dromaeosaurids) such as Microraptor) most non-avialan dinosaurs seem to have relied on land-based locomotion. A good understanding of how dinosaurs moved on the ground is key to models of dinosaur behavior; the science of biomechanics, pioneered by Robert McNeill Alexander, has provided significant insight in this area. For example, studies of the forces exerted by muscles and gravity on dinosaurs' skeletal structure have investigated how fast dinosaurs could run, whether diplodocids could create sonic booms via whip-like tail snapping, and whether sauropods could float.

=== Communication ===
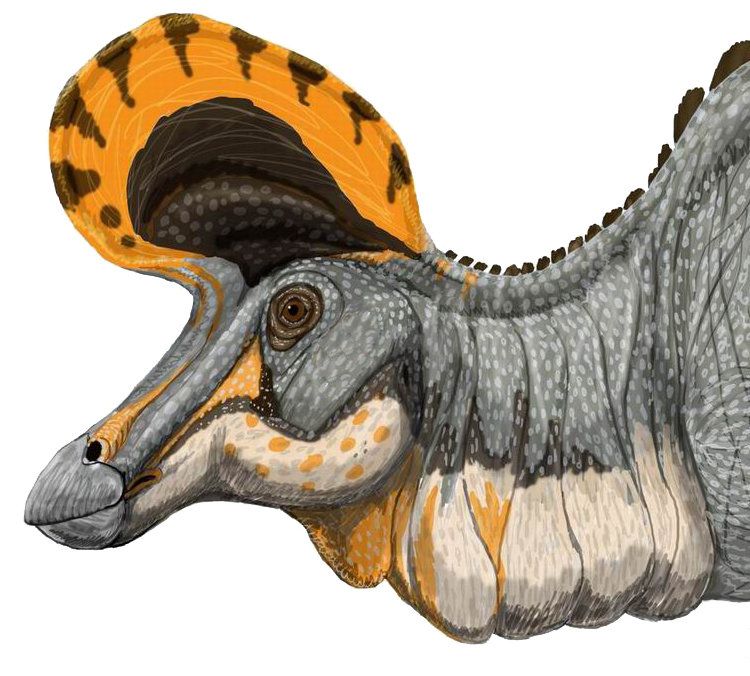
Restoration of a striking and unusual visual display in a Lambeosaurus magnicristatus. The crest may also have acted as a resonating chamber for sounds.

Modern birds communicate by visual and auditory signals, and the wide diversity of visual display structures among fossil dinosaur groups, such as horns, frills, crests, sails, and feathers, suggests that visual communication has always been important in dinosaur biology. Reconstruction of the plumage color of Anchiornis suggest the importance of color in visual communication in non-avian dinosaurs. A 2009 review indicated that non-avians used visual displays and possibly non-vocal sounds, such as hissing, jaw-grinding or -clapping, splashing, and wing-beating (possible in winged maniraptoran dinosaurs). Vocal communication in non-avian dinosaurs is indicated by the development of advanced hearing in nearly all major groups.

Fossilized larynx elements, which often serve as vocal organs in tetrapods, have been identified in two non-avian dinosaurs; the ankylosaurid Pinacosaurus and the neornithischian Pulaosaurus. Both were ossified (hardened to bone) with flexible joints similar to those of modern birds, which are adapted for opening the throat while the syrinx, a novel organ located at the base of the trachea, produces the calls. This setup suggests that the larynx in dinosaurs did not produce vocalizations but regulated and modified them as they were generated deeper in the respiratory tract. Hence, researchers suspect that the syrinx may have been present in non-avian dinosaurs, though the earliest known physical remains are from a specimen of the ancient bird Vegavis iaai dated 69 –66 million years ago.

A 2016 study concludes that some dinosaurs may have produced closed-mouth vocalizations, such as cooing, hooting, and booming. These occur in both reptiles and birds and involve inflating the esophagus or tracheal pouches. Such vocalizations evolved independently in extant archosaurs numerous times, following increases in body size. The crests of some hadrosaurids and the nasal chambers of ankylosaurids may have been resonators.

=== Reproductive biology ===
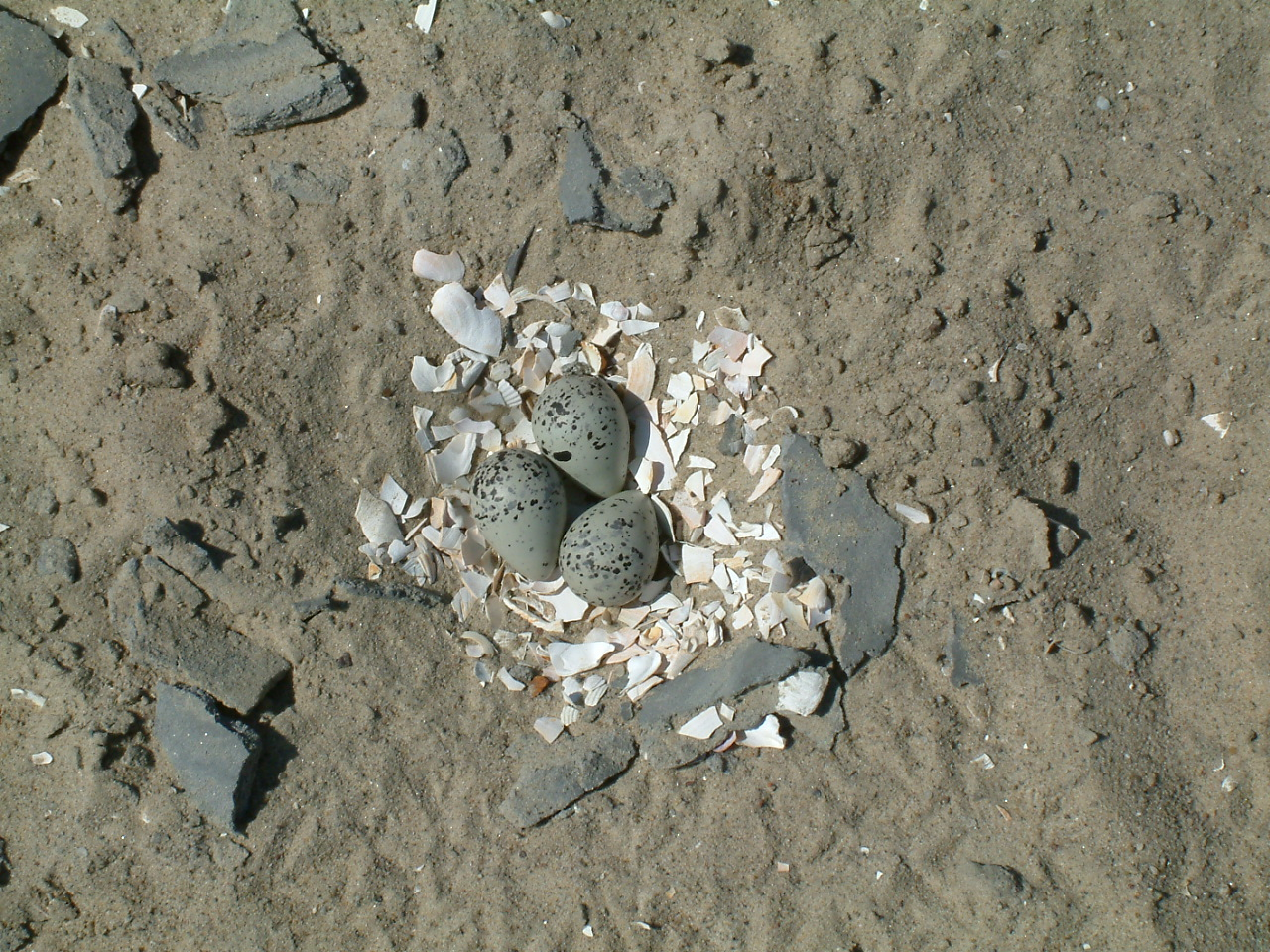
Nest of a plover (Charadrius)

All dinosaurs laid amniotic eggs. Dinosaur eggs were usually laid in a nest. Most species create somewhat elaborate nests which can be cups, domes, plates, beds scrapes, mounds, or burrows. Some species of modern bird have no nests; the cliff-nesting common guillemot lays its eggs on bare rock, and male emperor penguins keep eggs between their body and feet. Primitive birds and many non-avialan dinosaurs often lay eggs in communal nests, with males primarily incubating the eggs. While modern birds have only one functional oviduct and lay one egg at a time, more primitive birds and other dinosaurs had two oviducts, like crocodiles. Some non-avialan dinosaurs, such as Troodon, exhibited iterative laying, where the adult might lay a pair of eggs every one or two days, and then ensured simultaneous hatching by delaying brooding until all eggs were laid.

When laying eggs, females grow a special type of bone between the hard outer bone and the marrow of their limbs. This medullary bone, which is rich in calcium, is used to make eggshells. A discovery of features in a Tyrannosaurus skeleton provided evidence of medullary bone in extinct dinosaurs and, for the first time, allowed paleontologists to establish the sex of a fossil dinosaur specimen. Further research has found medullary bone in the carnosaur Allosaurus and the ornithopod Tenontosaurus. Because the line of dinosaurs that includes Allosaurus and Tyrannosaurus diverged from the line that led to Tenontosaurus very early in the evolution of dinosaurs, this suggests that the production of medullary tissue is a general characteristic of all dinosaurs.

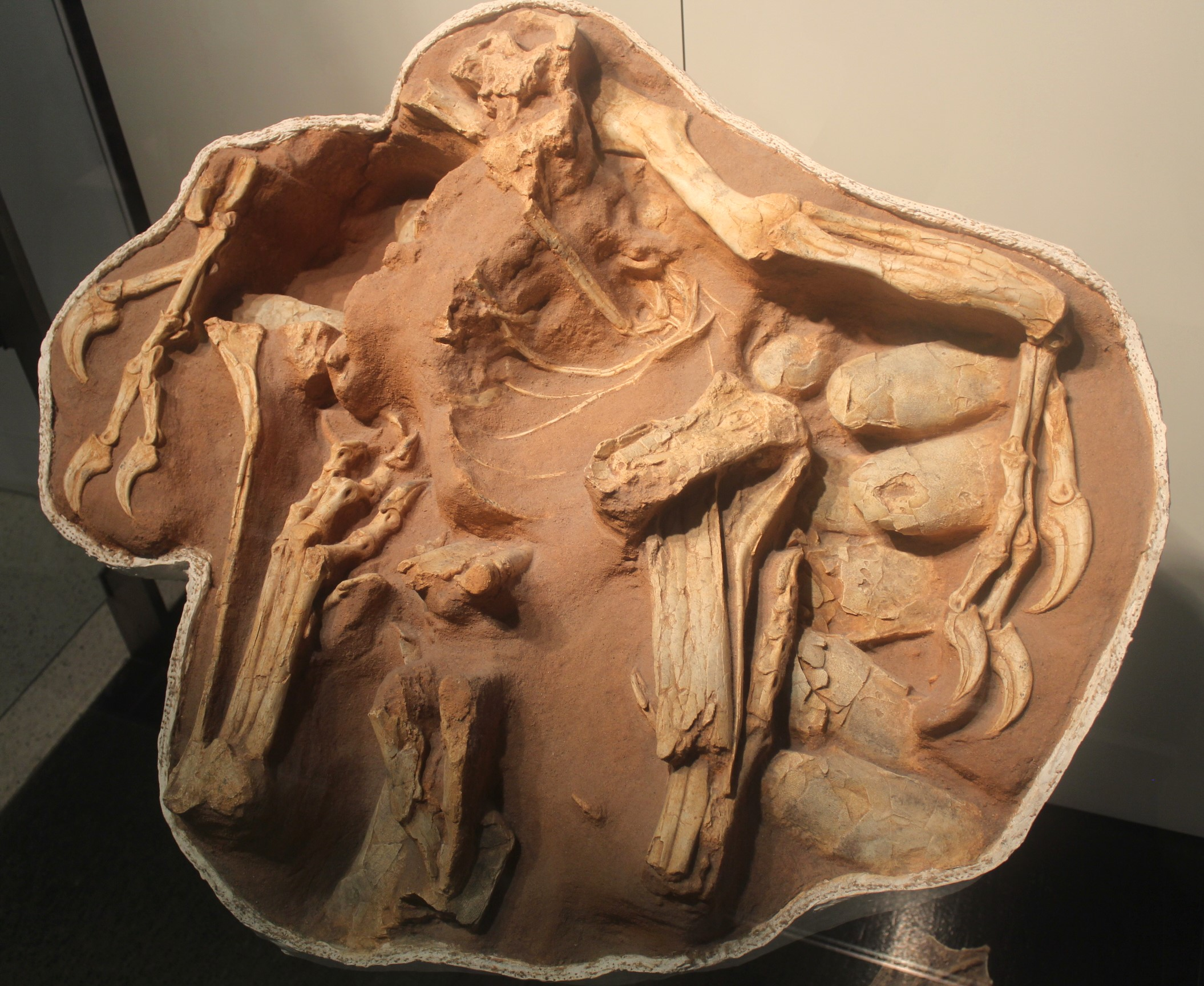
Fossil interpreted as a nesting oviraptorid Citipati at the American Museum of Natural History.

Another widespread trait among modern birds (but see below in regards to fossil groups and extant megapodes) is parental care for young after hatching. Bob Makela and Jack Horner's 1978 discovery of a Maiasaura ("good mother lizard") nesting ground in Montana demonstrated that parental care continued long after birth among ornithopods. A specimen of the oviraptorid Citipati osmolskae was discovered in a chicken-like brooding position in 1993, which may indicate that they had begun using an insulating layer of feathers to keep the eggs warm. An embryo of the basal sauropodomorph Massospondylus was found without teeth, indicating that some parental care was required to feed the young dinosaurs. Trackways have also confirmed parental behavior among ornithopods from the Isle of Skye in northwestern Scotland.

However, there is ample evidence of precociality or superprecociality among many dinosaur species, particularly theropods. For instance, non-ornithuromorph birds have been abundantly demonstrated to have had slow growth rates, megapode-like egg burying behavior and the ability to fly soon after birth. Both Tyrannosaurus and Troodon had juveniles with clear superprecociality and likely occupying different ecological niches than the adults. Superprecociality has been inferred for sauropods.

Genital structures are unlikely to fossilize as they lack scales that may allow preservation via pigmentation or residual calcium phosphate salts. In 2021, the best preserved specimen of a dinosaur's cloacal vent exterior was described for Psittacosaurus, demonstrating lateral swellings similar to crocodylian musk glands used in social displays by both sexes and pigmented regions which could also reflect a signalling function. However, this specimen on its own does not offer enough information to determine whether this dinosaur had sexual signalling functions; it only supports the possibility. Cloacal visual signalling can occur in either males or females in living birds, making it unlikely to be useful to determine sex for extinct dinosaurs. Unlike in some male mammals, there is no evidence of muscle attachments for a mobile penis nor a baculum (penis bone) in dinosaurs. The general sexual position for mating dinosaurs likely involved the male's leg over the female's back as she in positioned her hips upwards and her tail to the side. In some dinosaurs like Stegosaurus and Spinosaurus, the female may have laid on her side.

=== Physiology ===
Because both modern crocodilians and birds have four-chambered hearts (albeit modified in crocodilians), it is likely that this is a trait shared by all archosaurs, including all dinosaurs. While all modern birds have high metabolisms and are endothermic ("warm-blooded"), a vigorous debate has been ongoing since the 1960s regarding how far back in the dinosaur lineage this trait extended. Various researchers have supported dinosaurs as being endothermic, ectothermic ("cold-blooded"), or somewhere in between. An emerging consensus among researchers is that, while different lineages of dinosaurs would have had different metabolisms, most of them had higher metabolic rates than other reptiles but lower than living birds and mammals, which is termed mesothermy by some. Evidence from crocodiles and their extinct relatives suggests that such elevated metabolisms could have developed in the earliest archosaurs, which were the common ancestors of dinosaurs and crocodiles.

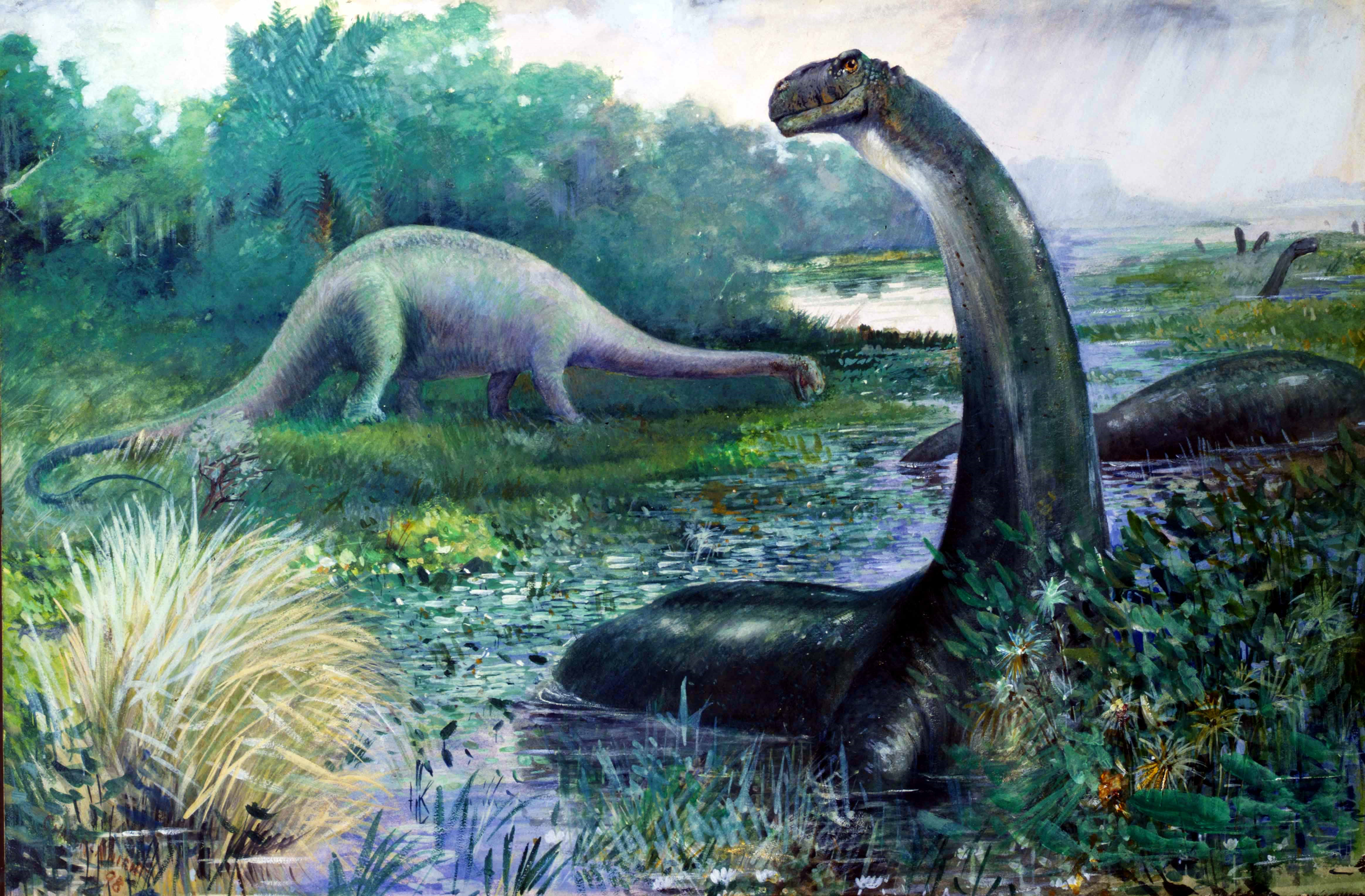
This 1897 restoration of Brontosaurus as an aquatic, tail-dragging animal, by Charles R. Knight, typified early views on dinosaur lifestyles.

After non-avian dinosaurs were discovered, paleontologists first posited that they were ectothermic. This was used to imply that the ancient dinosaurs were relatively slow, sluggish organisms, even though many modern reptiles are fast and light-footed despite relying on external sources of heat to regulate their body temperature. The idea of dinosaurs as ectothermic remained a prevalent view until Robert T. Bakker, an early proponent of dinosaur endothermy, published an influential paper on the topic in 1968. Bakker specifically used anatomical and ecological evidence to argue that sauropods, which had hitherto been depicted as sprawling aquatic animals with their tails dragging on the ground, were endotherms that lived vigorous, terrestrial lives. In 1972, Bakker expanded on his arguments based on energy requirements and predator-prey ratios. This was one of the seminal results that led to the dinosaur renaissance.

One of the greatest contributions to the modern understanding of dinosaur physiology has been paleohistology, the study of microscopic tissue structure in dinosaurs. From the 1960s forward, Armand de Ricqlès suggested that the presence of fibrolamellar bone—bony tissue with an irregular, fibrous texture and filled with blood vessels—was indicative of consistently fast growth and therefore endothermy. Fibrolamellar bone was common in both dinosaurs and pterosaurs, though not universally present. This has led to a significant body of work in reconstructing growth curves and modeling the evolution of growth rates across various dinosaur lineages, which has suggested overall that dinosaurs grew faster than living reptiles. Other lines of evidence suggesting endothermy include the presence of feathers and other types of body coverings in many lineages (see § Feathers); more consistent ratios of the isotope oxygen-18 in bony tissue compared to ectotherms, particularly as latitude and thus air temperature varied, which suggests stable internal temperatures (although these ratios can be altered during fossilization); and the discovery of polar dinosaurs, which lived in Australia, Antarctica, and Alaska when these places would have had cool, temperate climates.

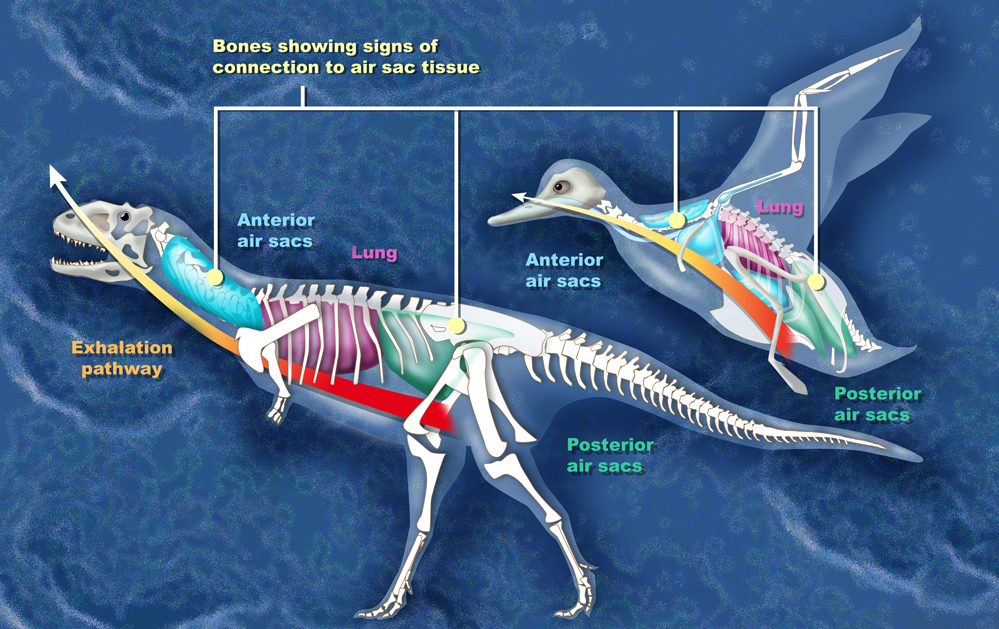
Comparison between the air sacs of an abelisaur and a bird

In saurischian dinosaurs, higher metabolisms were supported by the evolution of the avian respiratory system, characterized by an extensive system of air sacs that extended the lungs and invaded many of the bones in the skeleton, making them hollow. Such respiratory systems, which may have appeared in the earliest saurischians, would have provided them with more oxygen compared to a mammal of similar size, while also having a larger resting tidal volume and requiring a lower breathing frequency, which would have allowed them to sustain higher activity levels. The rapid airflow would also have been an effective cooling mechanism, which in conjunction with a lower metabolic rate would have prevented large sauropods from overheating. These traits may have enabled sauropods to grow quickly to gigantic sizes. Sauropods may also have benefitted from their size—their small surface area to volume ratio meant that they would have been able to thermoregulate more easily, a phenomenon termed gigantothermy.

Like other reptiles, dinosaurs are primarily uricotelic, that is, their kidneys extract nitrogenous wastes from their bloodstream and excrete it as uric acid instead of urea or ammonia via the ureters into the intestine. This would have helped them to conserve water. In most living species, uric acid is excreted along with feces as a semisolid waste. However, at least some modern birds (such as hummingbirds) can be facultatively ammonotelic, excreting most of the nitrogenous wastes as ammonia. This material, as well as the output of the intestines, emerges from the cloaca. In addition, many species regurgitate pellets, and fossil pellets are known as early as the Jurassic from Anchiornis.

The size and shape of the brain can be partly reconstructed based on the surrounding bones. In 1896, Marsh calculated ratios between brain weight and body weight of seven species of dinosaurs, showing that the brain of dinosaurs was proportionally smaller than in today's crocodiles, and that the brain of Stegosaurus was smaller than in any living land vertebrate. This contributed to the widespread public notion of dinosaurs as being sluggish and extraordinarily stupid. Harry Jerison, in 1973, showed that proportionally smaller brains are expected at larger body sizes, and that brain size in dinosaurs was not smaller than expected when compared to living reptiles. Later research showed that relative brain size progressively increased during the evolution of theropods, with the highest intelligence – comparable to that of modern birds – calculated for the troodontid Troodon.

== Origin of birds ==
The possibility that dinosaurs were the ancestors of birds was first suggested in 1868 by Thomas Henry Huxley. After the work of Gerhard Heilmann in the early 20th century, the theory of birds as dinosaur descendants was abandoned in favor of the idea of them being descendants of generalized thecodonts, with the key piece of evidence being the supposed lack of clavicles in dinosaurs. However, as later discoveries showed, clavicles (or a single fused wishbone, which derived from separate clavicles) were not actually absent; they had been found as early as 1924 in Oviraptor, but misidentified as an interclavicle. In the 1970s, John Ostrom revived the dinosaur–bird theory, which gained momentum in the coming decades with the advent of cladistic analysis, and a great increase in the discovery of small theropods and early birds. Of particular note have been the fossils of the Jehol Biota, where a variety of theropods and early birds have been found, often with feathers of some type. Birds share over a hundred distinct anatomical features with other theropod dinosaurs. They are most closely allied with maniraptoran coelurosaurs. A minority of scientists, most notably Alan Feduccia and Larry Martin, have proposed other evolutionary paths, including revised versions of Heilmann's basal archosaur proposal, or that maniraptoran theropods are the ancestors of birds but themselves are not dinosaurs, only convergent with dinosaurs.

=== Feathers ===
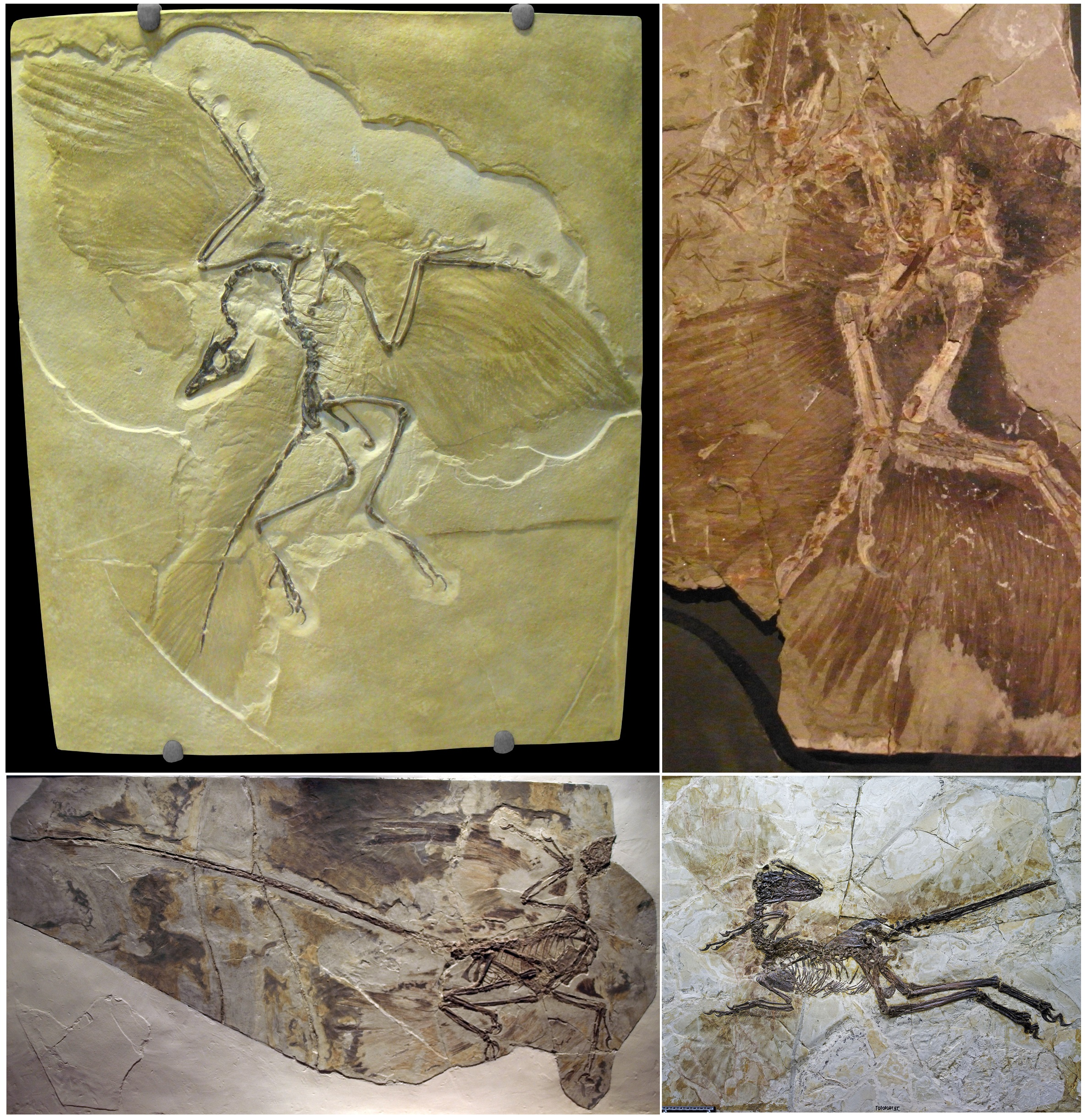
Various feathered non-avian dinosaurs, including Archaeopteryx, Anchiornis, Microraptor and Zhenyuanlong

Feathers are one of the most recognizable characteristics of modern birds, and a trait that was also shared by several non-avian dinosaurs. Based on the current distribution of fossil evidence, it appears that feathers were an ancestral dinosaurian trait, though one that may have been selectively lost in some species. Direct fossil evidence of feathers or feather-like structures has been discovered in a diverse array of species in many non-avian dinosaur groups, both among saurischians and ornithischians. Simple, branched, feather-like structures are known from heterodontosaurids, primitive neornithischians, and theropods, and primitive ceratopsians. Evidence for true, vaned feathers similar to the flight feathers of modern birds has been found only in the theropod subgroup Maniraptora, which includes oviraptorosaurs, troodontids, dromaeosaurids, and birds. Feather-like structures known as pycnofibres have also been found in pterosaurs.

However, researchers do not agree on whether these structures share a common origin between lineages (i.e., they are homologous), or if they were the result of widespread experimentation with skin coverings among ornithodirans. If the former is the case, filaments may have been common in the ornithodiran lineage and evolved before the appearance of dinosaurs themselves. Research into the genetics of American alligators has revealed that crocodylian scutes do possess feather-keratins during embryonic development, but these keratins are not expressed by the animals before hatching. The description of feathered dinosaurs has not been without controversy in general; perhaps the most vocal critics have been Alan Feduccia and Theagarten Lingham-Soliar, who have proposed that some purported feather-like fossils are the result of the decomposition of collagenous fiber that underlaid the dinosaurs' skin, and that maniraptoran dinosaurs with vaned feathers were not actually dinosaurs, but convergent with dinosaurs. However, their views have for the most part not been accepted by other researchers, to the point that the scientific nature of Feduccia's proposals has been questioned.

Archaeopteryx was the first fossil found that revealed a potential connection between dinosaurs and birds. It is considered a transitional fossil, in that it displays features of both groups. Brought to light just two years after Charles Darwin's seminal On the Origin of Species (1859), its discovery spurred the nascent debate between proponents of evolutionary biology and creationism. This early bird is so dinosaur-like that, without a clear impression of feathers in the surrounding rock, at least one specimen was mistaken for the small theropod Compsognathus. Since the 1990s, a number of additional feathered dinosaurs have been found, providing even stronger evidence of the close relationship between dinosaurs and modern birds. Many of these specimens were unearthed in the lagerstätten of the Jehol Biota. If feather-like structures were indeed widely present among non-avian dinosaurs, the lack of abundant fossil evidence for them may be due to the fact that delicate features like skin and feathers are seldom preserved by fossilization and thus often absent from the fossil record.

=== Skeleton ===
Because feathers are often associated with birds, feathered dinosaurs are often touted as the missing link between birds and dinosaurs. However, the multiple skeletal features also shared by the two groups represent another important line of evidence for paleontologists. Areas of the skeleton with important similarities include the neck, pubis, wrist (semi-lunate carpal), arm and pectoral girdle, furcula (wishbone), and breast bone. Comparison of bird and dinosaur skeletons through cladistic analysis strengthens the case for the link.

=== Soft anatomy ===
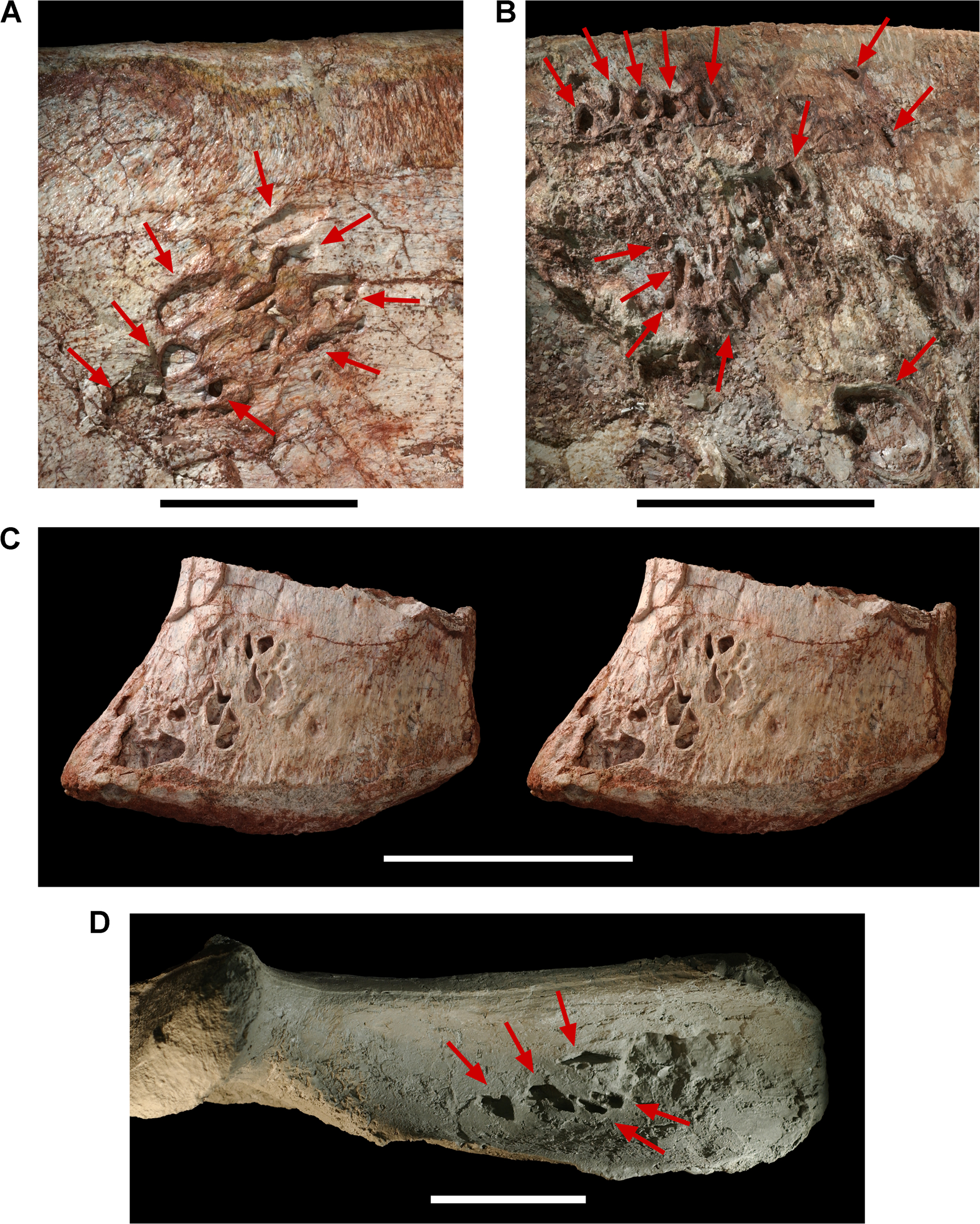
Pneumatopores on the left ilium of Aerosteon riocoloradensis

Large meat-eating dinosaurs had a complex system of air sacs similar to those found in modern birds, according to a 2005 investigation led by Patrick M. O'Connor. The lungs of theropod dinosaurs (carnivores that walked on two legs and had bird-like feet) likely pumped air into hollow sacs in their skeletons, as is the case in birds. "What was once formally considered unique to birds was present in some form in the ancestors of birds", O'Connor said. In 2008, scientists described Aerosteon riocoloradensis, the skeleton of which supplies the strongest evidence to date of a dinosaur with a bird-like breathing system. CT scanning of Aerosteon's fossil bones revealed evidence for the existence of air sacs within the animal's body cavity.

=== Behavioral evidence ===
Fossils of the troodonts Mei and Sinornithoides demonstrate that some dinosaurs slept with their heads tucked under their arms. This behavior, which may have helped to keep the head warm, is also characteristic of modern birds. Several deinonychosaur and oviraptorosaur specimens have also been found preserved on top of their nests, likely brooding in a bird-like manner. The ratio between egg volume and body mass of adults among these dinosaurs suggest that the eggs were primarily brooded by the male and that the young were highly precocial, similar to many modern ground-dwelling birds.

Some dinosaurs are known to have used gizzard stones like modern birds. These stones are swallowed by animals to aid digestion and break down food and hard fibers once they enter the stomach. When found in association with fossils, gizzard stones are called gastroliths.

== Extinction of major groups ==
All non-avian dinosaurs and most lineages of birds became extinct in a mass extinction event, called the Cretaceous–Paleogene (K-Pg) extinction event, at the end of the Cretaceous period. Above the Cretaceous–Paleogene boundary, which has been dated to 66.038 ± 0.025 million years ago, fossils of non-avian dinosaurs disappear abruptly; the absence of dinosaur fossils was historically used to assign rocks to the ensuing Cenozoic. The nature of the event that caused this mass extinction has been extensively studied since the 1970s, leading to the development of two mechanisms that are thought to have played major roles: an extraterrestrial impact event in the Yucatán Peninsula, along with flood basalt volcanism in India. However, the specific mechanisms of the extinction event and the extent of its effects on dinosaurs are still areas of ongoing research. Alongside dinosaurs, many other groups of animals became extinct: pterosaurs, marine reptiles such as mosasaurs and plesiosaurs, several groups of mammals, ammonites (nautilus-like mollusks), rudists (reef-building bivalves), and various groups of marine plankton. In all, approximately 47% of genera and 76% of species on Earth became extinct during the K-Pg extinction event. The relatively large size of most dinosaurs and the low diversity of small-bodied dinosaur species at the end of the Cretaceous may have contributed to their extinction; the extinction of the bird lineages that did not survive may also have been caused by a dependence on forest habitats or a lack of adaptations to eating seeds for survival.

=== Pre-extinction diversity ===
Just before the K-Pg extinction event, the number of non-avian dinosaur species that existed globally has been estimated at between 628 and 1078. It remains uncertain whether the diversity of dinosaurs was in gradual decline before the K-Pg extinction event, or whether dinosaurs were actually thriving prior to the extinction. Rock formations from the Maastrichtian epoch, which directly preceded the extinction, have been found to have lower diversity than the preceding Campanian epoch, which led to the prevailing view of a long-term decline in diversity. However, these comparisons did not account either for varying preservation potential between rock units or for different extents of exploration and excavation. In 1984, Dale Russell carried out an analysis to account for these biases, and found no evidence of a decline; another analysis by David Fastovsky and colleagues in 2004 even showed that dinosaur diversity continually increased until the extinction, but this analysis has been rebutted. Since then, different approaches based on statistics and mathematical models have variously supported either a sudden extinction or a gradual decline. End-Cretaceous trends in diversity may have varied between dinosaur lineages: it has been suggested that sauropods were not in decline, while ornithischians and theropods were in decline.

=== Impact event ===
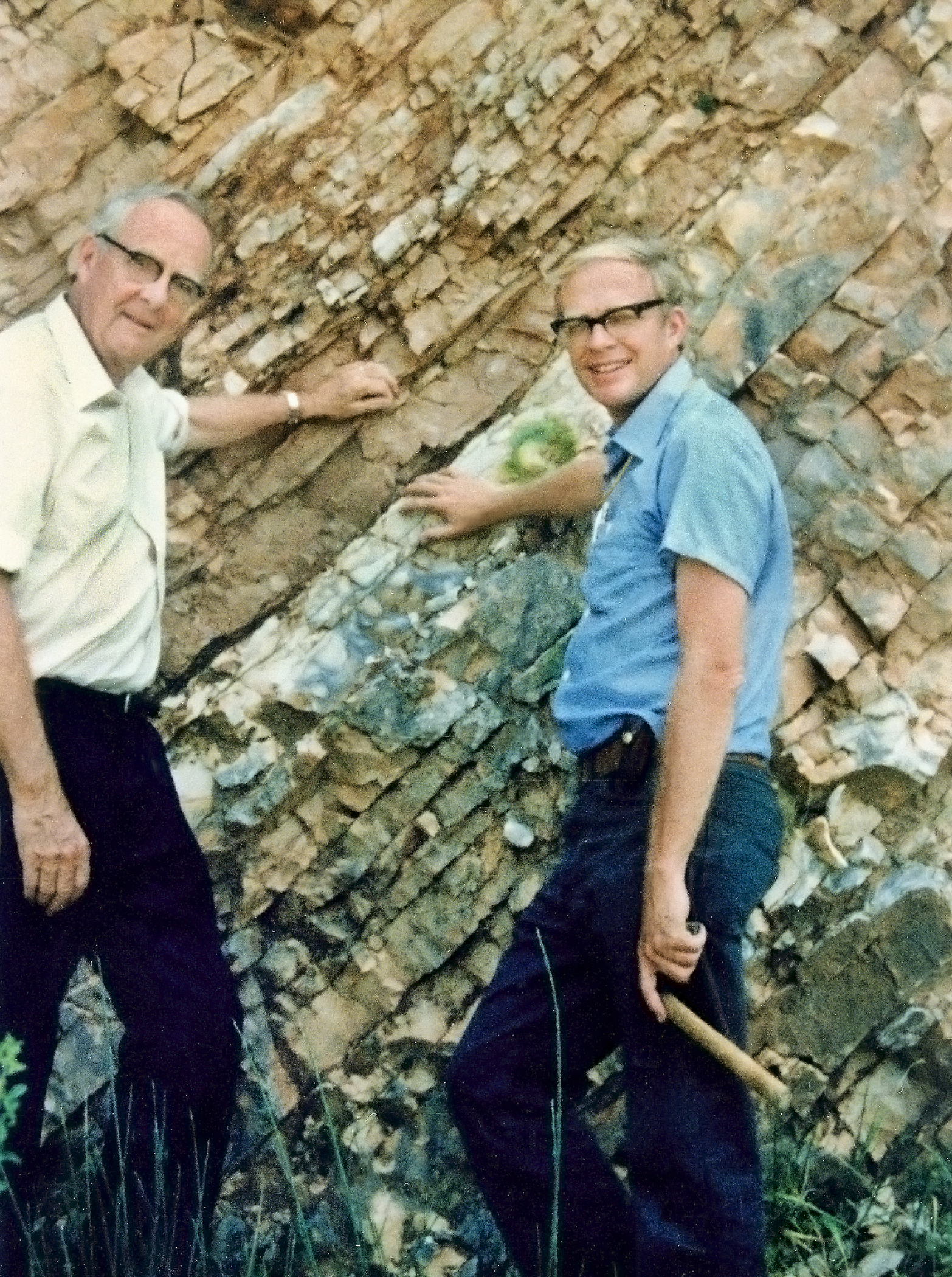
Luis (left) and his son Walter Alvarez (right) at the K-T Boundary in Gubbio, Italy, 1981

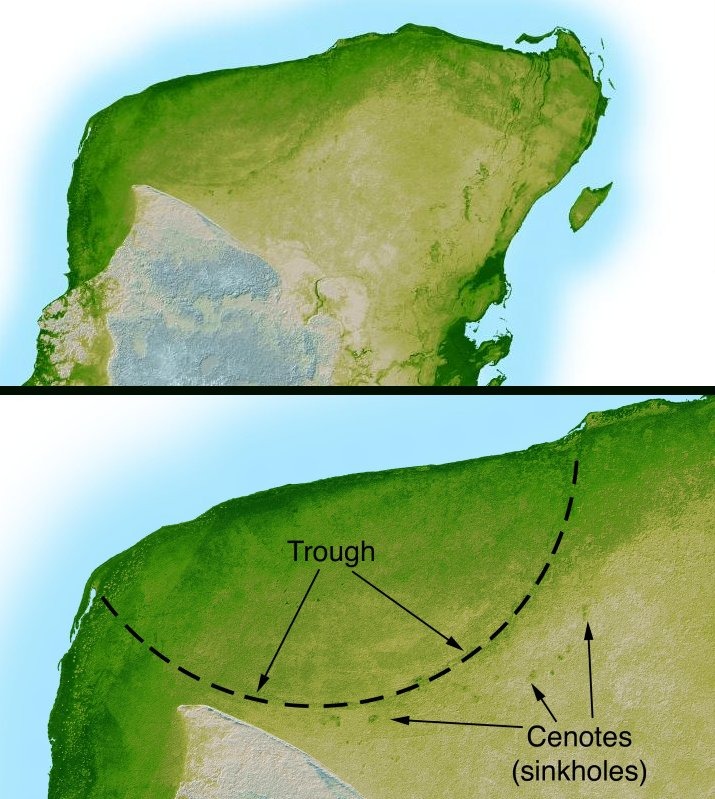
The Chicxulub Crater at the tip of the Yucatán Peninsula; the impactor that formed this crater may have caused the dinosaur extinction.

The bolide impact hypothesis, first brought to wide attention in 1980 by Walter Alvarez, Luis Alvarez, and colleagues, attributes the K-Pg extinction event to a bolide (extraterrestrial projectile) impact. Alvarez and colleagues proposed that a sudden increase in iridium levels, recorded around the world in rock deposits at the Cretaceous–Paleogene boundary, was direct evidence of the impact. Shocked quartz, indicative of a strong shockwave emanating from an impact, was also found worldwide. The actual impact site remained elusive until a crater measuring 180 km (110 mi) wide was discovered in the Yucatán Peninsula of southeastern Mexico, and was publicized in a 1991 paper by Alan Hildebrand and colleagues. Now, the bulk of the evidence suggests that a bolide 5 to 15 kilometers (3 to 9 1/2 miles) wide impacted the Yucatán Peninsula 66 million years ago, forming this crater and creating a "kill mechanism" that triggered the extinction event.

Within hours, the Chicxulub impact would have created immediate effects such as earthquakes, tsunamis, and a global firestorm that likely killed unsheltered animals and started wildfires. However, it would also have had longer-term consequences for the environment. Within days, sulfate aerosols released from rocks at the impact site would have contributed to acid rain and ocean acidification. Soot aerosols are thought to have spread around the world over the ensuing months and years; they would have cooled the surface of the Earth by reflecting thermal radiation, and greatly slowed photosynthesis by blocking out sunlight, thus creating an impact winter. (This role was ascribed to sulfate aerosols until experiments demonstrated otherwise.) The cessation of photosynthesis would have led to the collapse of food webs depending on leafy plants, which included all dinosaurs save for grain-eating birds.

=== Deccan Traps ===
At the time of the K-Pg extinction, the Deccan Traps flood basalts of India were actively erupting. The eruptions can be separated into three phases around the K-Pg boundary, two prior to the boundary and one after. The second phase, which occurred very close to the boundary, would have extruded 70 to 80% of the volume of these eruptions in intermittent pulses that occurred around 100,000 years apart. Greenhouse gases such as carbon dioxide and sulfur dioxide would have been released by this volcanic activity, resulting in climate change through temperature perturbations of roughly 3 °C (5.4 °F) but possibly as high as 7 °C (13 °F). Like the Chicxulub impact, the eruptions may also have released sulfate aerosols, which would have caused acid rain and global cooling. However, due to large error margins in the dating of the eruptions, the role of the Deccan Traps in the K-Pg extinction remains unclear.

Before 2000, arguments that the Deccan Traps eruptions—as opposed to the Chicxulub impact—caused the extinction were usually linked to the view that the extinction was gradual. Prior to the discovery of the Chicxulub crater, the Deccan Traps were used to explain the global iridium layer; even after the crater's discovery, the impact was still thought to only have had a regional, not global, effect on the extinction event. In response, Luis Alvarez rejected volcanic activity as an explanation for the iridium layer and the extinction as a whole. Since then, however, most researchers have adopted a more moderate position, which identifies the Chicxulub impact as the primary progenitor of the extinction while also recognizing that the Deccan Traps may also have played a role. Walter Alvarez himself has acknowledged that the Deccan Traps and other ecological factors may have contributed to the extinctions in addition to the Chicxulub impact. Some estimates have placed the start of the second phase in the Deccan Traps eruptions within 50,000 years after the Chicxulub impact. Combined with mathematical modelling of the seismic waves that would have been generated by the impact, this has led to the suggestion that the Chicxulub impact may have triggered these eruptions by increasing the permeability of the mantle plume underlying the Deccan Traps.

Whether the Deccan Traps were a major cause of the extinction, on par with the Chicxulub impact, remains uncertain. Proponents consider the climatic impact of the sulfur dioxide released to have been on par with the Chicxulub impact, and also note the role of flood basalt volcanism in other mass extinctions like the Permian-Triassic extinction event. They consider the Chicxulub impact to have worsened the ongoing climate change caused by the eruptions. Meanwhile, detractors point out the sudden nature of the extinction and that other pulses in Deccan Traps activity of comparable magnitude did not appear to have caused extinctions. They also contend that the causes of different mass extinctions should be assessed separately. In 2020, Alfio Chiarenza and colleagues suggested that the Deccan Traps may even have had the opposite effect: they suggested that the long-term warming caused by its carbon dioxide emissions may have dampened the impact winter from the Chicxulub impact.

=== Possible Paleocene survivors ===
Non-avian dinosaur remains have occasionally been found above the K-Pg boundary. In 2000, Spencer Lucas and colleagues reported the discovery of a single hadrosaur right femur in the San Juan Basin of New Mexico, and described it as evidence of Paleocene dinosaurs. The rock unit in which the bone was discovered has been dated to the early Paleocene epoch, approximately 64.8 million years ago. If the bone was not re-deposited by weathering action, it would provide evidence that some dinosaur populations survived at least half a million years into the Cenozoic. Other evidence includes the presence of dinosaur remains in the Hell Creek Formation up to 1.3 m (4.3 ft) above the Cretaceous–Paleogene boundary, representing 40,000 years of elapsed time. This has been used to support the view that the K-Pg extinction was gradual. However, these supposed Paleocene dinosaurs are considered by many other researchers to be reworked, that is, washed out of their original locations and then reburied in younger sediments. The age estimates have also been considered unreliable.

== Cultural depictions ==
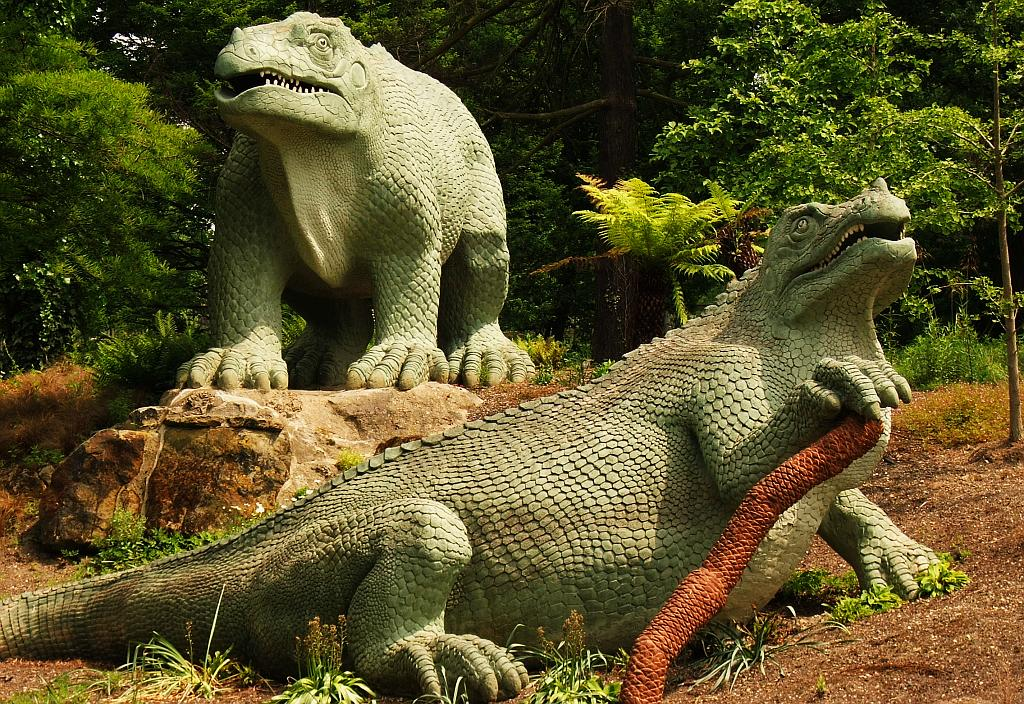
Outdated Iguanodon statues created by Benjamin Waterhouse Hawkins for the Crystal Palace Park in 1853

Gertie the Dinosaur (1914) by Winsor McCay, featuring the first animated dinosaur

By human standards, dinosaurs were creatures of fantastic appearance and often enormous size. As such, they have captured the popular imagination and become an enduring part of human culture. The entry of the word "dinosaur" into the common vernacular reflects the animals' cultural importance: in English, "dinosaur" is commonly used to describe anything that is impractically large, obsolete, or bound for extinction.

Public enthusiasm for dinosaurs first developed in Victorian England, where in 1854, three decades after the first scientific descriptions of dinosaur remains, a menagerie of lifelike dinosaur sculptures was unveiled in London's Crystal Palace Park. The Crystal Palace dinosaurs proved so popular that a strong market in smaller replicas soon developed. In subsequent decades, dinosaur exhibits opened at parks and museums around the world, ensuring that successive generations would be introduced to the animals in an immersive and exciting way. The enduring popularity of dinosaurs, in its turn, has resulted in significant public funding for dinosaur science, and has frequently spurred new discoveries. In the United States, for example, the competition between museums for public attention led directly to the Bone Wars of the 1880s and 1890s, during which a pair of feuding paleontologists made enormous scientific contributions.

The popular preoccupation with dinosaurs has ensured their appearance in literature, film, and other media. Beginning in 1852 with a passing mention in Charles Dickens' Bleak House, dinosaurs have been featured in large numbers of fictional works. Jules Verne's 1864 novel Journey to the Center of the Earth, Sir Arthur Conan Doyle's 1912 book The Lost World, the 1914 animated film Gertie the Dinosaur (featuring the first animated dinosaur), the iconic 1933 film King Kong, the 1954 Godzilla and its many sequels, the best-selling 1990 novel Jurassic Park by Michael Crichton and its 1993 film adaptation are just a few notable examples of dinosaur appearances in fiction. Authors of general-interest non-fiction works about dinosaurs, including some prominent paleontologists, have often sought to use the animals as a way to educate readers about science in general. Dinosaurs are ubiquitous in advertising; numerous companies have referenced dinosaurs in printed or televised advertisements, either in order to sell their own products or in order to characterize their rivals as slow-moving, dim-witted, or obsolete.

== See also ==
- Dinosaur diet and feeding
- Evolutionary history of life
- Lists of dinosaur-bearing stratigraphic units
- List of dinosaur genera
- List of bird genera
- List of birds
- List of informally named dinosaurs
- List of films featuring dinosaurs

== Bibliography ==
- Alvarez, Walter (1997). T. rex and the Crater of Doom. Princeton, NJ: Princeton University Press. ISBN 978-0-691-01630-6. LCCN 96049208. OCLC 1007846558.
- Bakker, Robert T. (1986). The Dinosaur Heresies: New Theories Unlocking the Mystery of the Dinosaurs and Their Extinction. New York: William Morrow and Company. ISBN 978-0-688-04287-5. LCCN 86012643. OCLC 13699558.
- Benton, Michael J. (2015). Vertebrate Palaeontology (4th [completely revised] ed.). Oxford: Wiley Blackwell. ISBN 978-1-118-40684-7.
- Benton, Michael J. (2005). Vertebrate Palaeontology (3rd ed.). Malden, MA: Blackwell Publishing. ISBN 978-0-632-05637-8. LCCN 2003028152. OCLC 53970617.
- Brusatte, Stephen L. (2012). Benton, Michael J. (ed.). Dinosaur Paleobiology. Topics in Paleobiology. Foreword by Michael J. Benton. Hoboken, NJ: Wiley-Blackwell. Bibcode:2012dipa.book.....B. doi:10.1002/9781118274071. ISBN 978-0-470-65658-7. LCCN 2011050466. OCLC 781864955.
- Chiappe, Luis M.; Witmer, Lawrence M., eds. (2002). Mesozoic Birds: Above the Heads of Dinosaurs. Berkeley: University of California Press. ISBN 978-0-520-20094-4. LCCN 2001044600. OCLC 901747962.
- Colbert, Edwin H. (1971) [Originally published, New York: E. P. Dutton, 1968; London: Evans Brothers Ltd, 1969]. Men and Dinosaurs: The Search in Field and Laboratory. Harmondsworth: Penguin. ISBN 978-0-14-021288-4. OCLC 16208760.
- Cowen, Richard (2005). History of Life (4th ed.). Malden, MA: Blackwell Publishing. ISBN 978-1-4051-1756-2. LCCN 2003027993. OCLC 53970577. The 5th edition of the book is available from the Internet Archive. Retrieved 2019-10-19.
- Currie, Philip J.; Padian, Kevin, eds. (1997). Encyclopedia of Dinosaurs. San Diego, CA: Academic Press. ISBN 978-0-12-226810-6. LCCN 97023430. OCLC 436848919.
- Currie, Philip J.; Koppelhus, Eva B.; Shugar, Martin A.; Wright, Joanna L., eds. (2004). Feathered Dragons: Studies on the Transition from Dinosaurs to Birds. Life of the Past. Bloomington, IN: Indiana University Press. ISBN 978-0-253-34373-4. LCCN 2003019035. OCLC 52942941.
- Curry Rogers, Kristina A.; Wilson, Jeffrey A., eds. (2005). The Sauropods: Evolution and Paleobiology. Berkeley: University of California Press. ISBN 978-0-520-24623-2. LCCN 2005010624. OCLC 879179542.
- Desmond, Adrian J. (1975). The Hot-Blooded Dinosaurs: A Revolution in Palaeontology. London: Blond & Briggs. ISBN 978-0-8037-3755-6. LCCN 76359907. OL 4933052M.
- Dickens, Charles (1853). Bleak House. London: Bradbury and Evans.
- Dodson, Peter; Gingerich, Philip D., eds. (1993). Functional Morphology and Evolution. American Journal of Science. Vol. 293A. New Haven, CT: Kline Geology Laboratory, Yale University. ISSN 0002-9599. OCLC 27781160.
- Dong, Zhiming (1992). Dinosaurian Faunas of China (English ed.). Beijing; Berlin; New York: China Ocean Press; Springer-Verlag. ISBN 978-3-540-52084-9. LCCN 92207835. OCLC 26522845.
- Dyke, Gareth; Kaiser, Gary, eds. (2011). Living Dinosaurs: The Evolutionary History of Modern Birds. Chichester; Hoboken, NJ: Wiley-Blackwell. ISBN 978-0-470-65666-2. LCCN 2010043277. OCLC 729724640.
- Farlow, James O.; Brett-Surman, M.K., eds. (1997). The Complete Dinosaur. Bloomington, IN: Indiana University Press. ISBN 978-0-253-33349-0. LCCN 97-23698. OCLC 924985811.
- Foster, John R.; Lucas, Spencer G., eds. (2006). "Paleontology and Geology of the Upper Jurassic Morrison Formation". Bulletin of the New Mexico Museum of Natural History and Science. New Mexico Museum of Natural History and Science Bulletin. 36. Albuquerque, NM: New Mexico Museum of Natural History and Science. ISSN 1524-4156. OCLC 77520577.
- Glut, Donald F. (1997). Dinosaurs: The Encyclopedia. Foreword by Michael K. Brett-Surman. Jefferson, NC: McFarland & Company. ISBN 978-0-89950-917-4. LCCN 95047668. OCLC 33665881.
- Gunther, Robert Theodore, ed. (1968) [First printed in Oxford 1945]. Life and Letters of Edward Lhwyd. Early Science in Oxford. Vol. XIV. Preface by Albert Everard Gunther (Reprint ed.). London: Dawsons of Pall Mall. ISBN 978-0-7129-0292-2. LCCN 22005926. OCLC 43529321.
- Hansell, Mike (2000). Bird Nests and Construction Behaviour. Pen and ink illustration by Raith Overhill. Cambridge: University of Cambridge Press. ISBN 978-0-521-46038-5. LCCN 99087681. OCLC 876286627.
- Heilmann, Gerhard (1926). The Origin of Birds. London; New York: H. F. & G. Witherby; D. Appleton & Company. LCCN 27001127. OCLC 606021642.
- Holmes, Thom (1998). Fossil Feud: The Rivalry of the First American Dinosaur Hunters. Parsippany, NJ: Julian Messner. ISBN 978-0-382-39149-1. LCCN 96013610. OCLC 34472600.
- Holtz, Thomas R. Jr. (2007). Dinosaurs: The Most Complete, Up-to-Date Encyclopedia for Dinosaur Lovers of All Ages. Illustrated by Luis V. Rey. New York: Random House. ISBN 978-0-375-82419-7. LCCN 2006102491. OCLC 77486015.
- Lambert, David; The Diagram Group (1990). The Dinosaur Data Book: The Definitive, Fully Illustrated Encyclopedia of Dinosaurs. New York: Avon Books. ISBN 978-0-380-75896-8. LCCN 89092487. OCLC 21833417.
- Lessem, Don; Glut, Donald F. (1993). The Dinosaur Society's Dinosaur Encyclopedia. Illustrations by Tracy Lee Ford; scientific advisors, Peter Dodson, et al. New York: Random House. ISBN 978-0-679-41770-5. LCCN 94117716. OCLC 30361459.
- Lhuyd, Edward (1699). Lithophylacii Britannici ichnographia [British figured stones]. London: Ex Officina M.C. Archived from the original on August 14, 2020.
- Mayr, Gerald (2009). Paleogene Fossil Birds. Berlin: Springer-Verlag. doi:10.1007/978-3-540-89628-9. ISBN 978-3-540-89627-2. LCCN 2008940962. OCLC 916182693. S2CID 88941254.
- Norell, Mark; Gaffney, Eugene S.; Dingus, Lowell (2000) [Originally published as Discovering Dinosaurs in the American Museum of Natural History. New York: Knopf, 1995]. Discovering Dinosaurs: Evolution, Extinction, and the Lessons of Prehistory (Revised ed.). Berkeley: University of California Press. ISBN 978-0-520-22501-5. LCCN 99053335. OCLC 977125867.
- Olshevsky, George (2000). An Annotated Checklist of Dinosaur Species by Continent. Mesozoic Meanderings. Vol. 3. Illustrated by Tracy Lee Ford. San Diego, CA: Publications Requiring Research. ISSN 0271-9428. LCCN 00708700. OCLC 44433611.
- Owen, Richard (1842). "Report on British Fossil Reptiles. Part II". Report of the Eleventh Meeting of the British Association for the Advancement of Science; Held at Plymouth in July 1841. London: John Murray. pp. 60–204. LCCN 99030427. OCLC 1015526268.
- Padian, Kevin, ed. (1986). The Origin of Birds and the Evolution of Flight. Memoirs of the California Academy of Sciences. Vol. 8. San Francisco, CA: California Academy of Sciences. ISBN 978-0-940228-14-6. OCLC 946083441. OL 9826926M.
- Parsons, Keith M. (2001). Drawing out Leviathan: Dinosaurs and the Science Wars. Life in the Past. Bloomington, IN: Indiana University Press. ISBN 978-0-253-33937-9. LCCN 2001016803. OCLC 50174737.
- Paul, Gregory S. (1988). Predatory Dinosaurs of the World: A Complete Illustrated Guide. New York: Simon & Schuster. ISBN 978-0-671-61946-6. LCCN 88023052. OCLC 859819093.
- Paul, Gregory S., ed. (2000). The Scientific American Book of Dinosaurs (1st ed.). New York: St. Martin's Press. ISBN 978-0-312-26226-6. LCCN 2001269051. OCLC 45256074.
- Paul, Gregory S. (2010). The Princeton Field Guide to Dinosaurs. Princeton Field Guides. Princeton, NJ: Princeton University Press. ISBN 978-0-691-13720-9. LCCN 2010014916. OCLC 907619291.
- Plot, Robert (1677). The Natural History of Oxford-shire: Being an Essay toward the Natural History of England. Oxford; London: S. Millers. LCCN 11004267. OCLC 933062622.
- Randall, Lisa (2015). Dark Matter and the Dinosaurs: The Astounding Interconnectedness of the Universe. New York: HarperCollins. ISBN 978-0-06-232847-2. LCCN 2016427646. OCLC 962371431.
- Rupke, Nicolaas A. (1994). Richard Owen: Victorian Naturalist. New Haven: Yale University Press. ISBN 978-0-300-05820-8. LCCN 93005739. OCLC 844183804.
- Sarjeant, William A.S., ed. (1995). Vertebrate Fossils and the Evolution of Scientific Concepts: Writings in Tribute to Beverly Halstead, by Some of His Many Friends. Modern Geology, vol. 18. Reading: Gordon and Breach Publishers. ISBN 978-2-88124-996-9. ISSN 0026-7775. LCCN 00500382. OCLC 34672546. "Reprint of papers published in a special volume of Modern geology [v. 18 (Halstead memorial volume), 1993], with five additional contributions.--Pref."
- Tanner, Lawrence H.; Spielmann, Justin A.; Lucas, Spencer G., eds. (2013). "The Triassic System: New Developments in Stratigraphy and Paleontology". Bulletin of the New Mexico Museum of Natural History and Science. New Mexico Museum of Natural History and Science Bulletin. 61. Albuquerque, NM: New Mexico Museum of Natural History and Science. ISSN 1524-4156. OCLC 852432407.
- Weishampel, David B.; Dodson, Peter; Osmólska, Halszka, eds. (2004). The Dinosauria (2nd ed.). Berkeley: University of California Press. ISBN 978-0-520-25408-4. LCCN 2004049804. OCLC 154697781.
