= List of Danish research ships =

A number of ships have been used for Danish marine research and Danish-led expeditions. Some were dedicated research ships and functional in many years, other were bought or chartered for a limited time for one or more dedicated expeditions. These expeditions are typically named after the ship.

Most information has been compiled from Sandbeck (2007), Wolff (1967) and Christiansen (2010). Additional references are listed in the table.

The table does not include research ships that are or were operated independently by Greenland and the Faroe Islands (such as R/V Sanna, M/V Tarajoq and R/V Jákup Sverri), which are self-governing parts of the Kingdom of Denmark.

Ship name	Prior/later names	Ship lifetime	Time as research vessel	Major expeditions	Notable scientists on board	Comments/references
HDMS Grønland		1756-91	1761	Danish Arabia Expedition	Peter Forsskål; Carsten Niebuhr; Fr. Chr. von Haven	
HDMS Bellona		1830-68	1840-41	South America 1840-41	Henrik Nikolai Krøyer	
HDMS Ørnen		1842-66	1846	Danish West Indies	A.S. Ørsted	Ørsted also used other navy ships while in the Caribbean
HDMS Galathea		1831-89	1845-47	Galathea I	H.J. Rink; J.T. Reinhardt	
Dijmphna	Linkjöping	1871-1889	1882-83		Theo H. Holm	
HDMS Hauch		1862-1900	1883-86		C.G.Johannes Petersen	In later years fisheries inspection ship
HDMS Fylla		1862-1903	1884-86	Fylla expeditions	Eugen Warming; Theo H. Holm; J.L.K. Rosenvinge	
Transportskib No. 3		1858-1940	1890-1940		C.G.Johannes Petersen; A.C.Johansen	Mobile biological laboratory
Hekla	Scotia	1872-1916	1891-92	Hekla Expedition	H. Deichmann; Nikolaj Hartz	
HDMS Ingolf		1876-1926	1895-96	Ingolf Expedition	C. Wesenberg-Lund; C.H.Ostenfeld; Martin Knudsen; William Lundbeck; H. Jungersen; H.J. Hansen	
Antarctic	Cap Nord	1871-1903	1898-1900	The Carlsberg Foundation East Greenland Expedition		Norwegian/Swedish privately owned
Sallingsund	Japetus Steenstrup	1873-1932	1899-1932		C.G.Johannes Petersen	Owned by the Danish Biological Station
Danmark	Sir Colin Campell; Magdalena	1855-1917	1906-08	Danmark Expedition	L. Mylius-Erichsen; Alfred Wegener	Former whaler
Thor		1899-1929	1902-19	1st and 2nd Thor Expeditions	J. Schmidt	
Tjalfe		1853-1950	1908-1909	Greenland Fisheries Expeditions	Adolf Jensen	
Margrethe		?-1913	1913	West Indies	J. Schmidt	Wrecked on coral reef on Anegada.
Dana I	Carina; Guiseppina V	1919-41	1920-21	1st and 2nd Dana expeditions	J. Schmidt Aage V. Tåning	Owned by EAC
Dana II	HMT John Quilliam	1917-35	1921-35	3rd Dana expedition	J. Schmidt; H.R.G. Spärck Aage V. Tåning	Sunk in collision in the North Sea
Godthaab	Hvitabjörn	1898-1984	1926-34	Godthaab Expedition, Three-year Expedition to East Greenland	Lauge Koch; Gunnar Seidenfaden	
Gustav Holm	Fox II	1893-1959	1931-34	Three-year Expedition to East Greenland	Lauge Koch	
Biologen	Knøsen	1932-1974	1932-64			Owned by the Danish Biological Station
Thor	Albertina	1930-?	1934-35			Fate after 1935 unknown
Dana III	Esvagt Dana; Gulden Leeuw	1937–present	1937-1978	Sargasso Sea 1966	Erik Bertelsen	
Søkongen	Knud, Polar Ægidius	1919-1972			Ejnar Mikkelsen Knud Rasmussen	
Atlantide	Shenandoah	1902–present	1945-46	Atlantide Expedition	Anton Bruun; F.C. Fraser	Owned by sculptor Viggo Jarl
HDMS Galathea	HMS Leith	1935-55	1950-52	Galathea II	Anton Bruun; Torben Wolff	
Noona Dan	Havet; Seute Deern	1939–present	1961-62	Noona Dan-ekspedition	Finn Salomonsen; Lorenz P. Ferdinand	
Dana IV		1980–present	1980–present	Danish eel expedition		Owned by the Technical University of Denmark
HDMS Vædderen		1990–present	2006-2007	Galathea III		Fisheries inspection and coast guard vessel
Aurora		2014–present	2014–present			Owned by Aarhus University

Overview of ships which serve or has served as Danish research ships. Also indicated are ships purchased specifically for major Danish funded expeditions.

In other service
Royal Danish Navy
Active as research ship
Expedition

== Notes ==
1. History before 1913 unknown
2. Fate after 1935 unknown
