= Ceratocaulon =

Scientific classification
- Kingdom: Animalia
- Phylum: Cnidaria
- Subphylum: Anthozoa
- Class: Octocorallia
- Order: incertae sedis
- Genus: Ceratocaulon; Jungersen, 1892
- Species: C. wandeli

Binomial name
- Ceratocaulon wandeli Jungersen, 1892

Genus of cnidarians

Ceratocaulon is a genus of soft corals in the family Xeniidae. It is monotypic with a single species, Ceratocaulon wandeli. It was first found by Hector Frederik Estrup Jungersen in 1892.
