= Fox 2 =

Fox 2 may refer to:

== Television stations in the United States ==
=== Affiliated with the Fox Broadcasting Company ===
==== Owned-and-operated ====
- KTVU in Oakland–San Francisco, California
- WJBK in Detroit, Michigan

==== Current affiliates ====
- KATN-DT2 in Fairbanks, Alaska
- KGAN-DT2 in Cedar Rapids, Iowa
- KHON-TV in Honolulu, Hawaii
- KTVI in St. Louis, Missouri

==== Formerly affiliated ====
- KASA-TV in Albuquerque–Santa Fe, New Mexico (1993–2017)
- XHRIO in McAllen, Texas (licensed to Matamoros, Tamaulipas, Mexico; 2005–2012)

=== Affiliated with Fox ===
- Fox Sports 2

== Military ==
- Infrared homing missile, also referred to as the "fox two" missile type
- Fairey Fox II, a British interwar biplane bomber
- HMS Fox II, Lerwick, Shetland, Scotland, UK; a Coastal Forces base, see HMS Fox
- Fox two, a brevity code used by NATO pilots; see Fox (code word)

== Ships ==
- Gustav Holm, also known as Fox II; see List of Danish research ships
- HMT Lea Rig, also known as Fox II; see List of requisitioned trawlers of the Royal Navy (WWII)

== Other uses ==
- RBM9 (RNA binding motif protein 9), also called FOX-2
- Fox II script, a written script for the Fox language
- Fox Two, Downtown, Edmonton, Alberta, Canada; see List of tallest buildings in Edmonton
- Fox Two, a wargame from A&A Game Engineering; see Air wargaming

== See also ==
- Fox (disambiguation)
