= Eiler Lehn Schiøler =

Danish ornithologist and banker

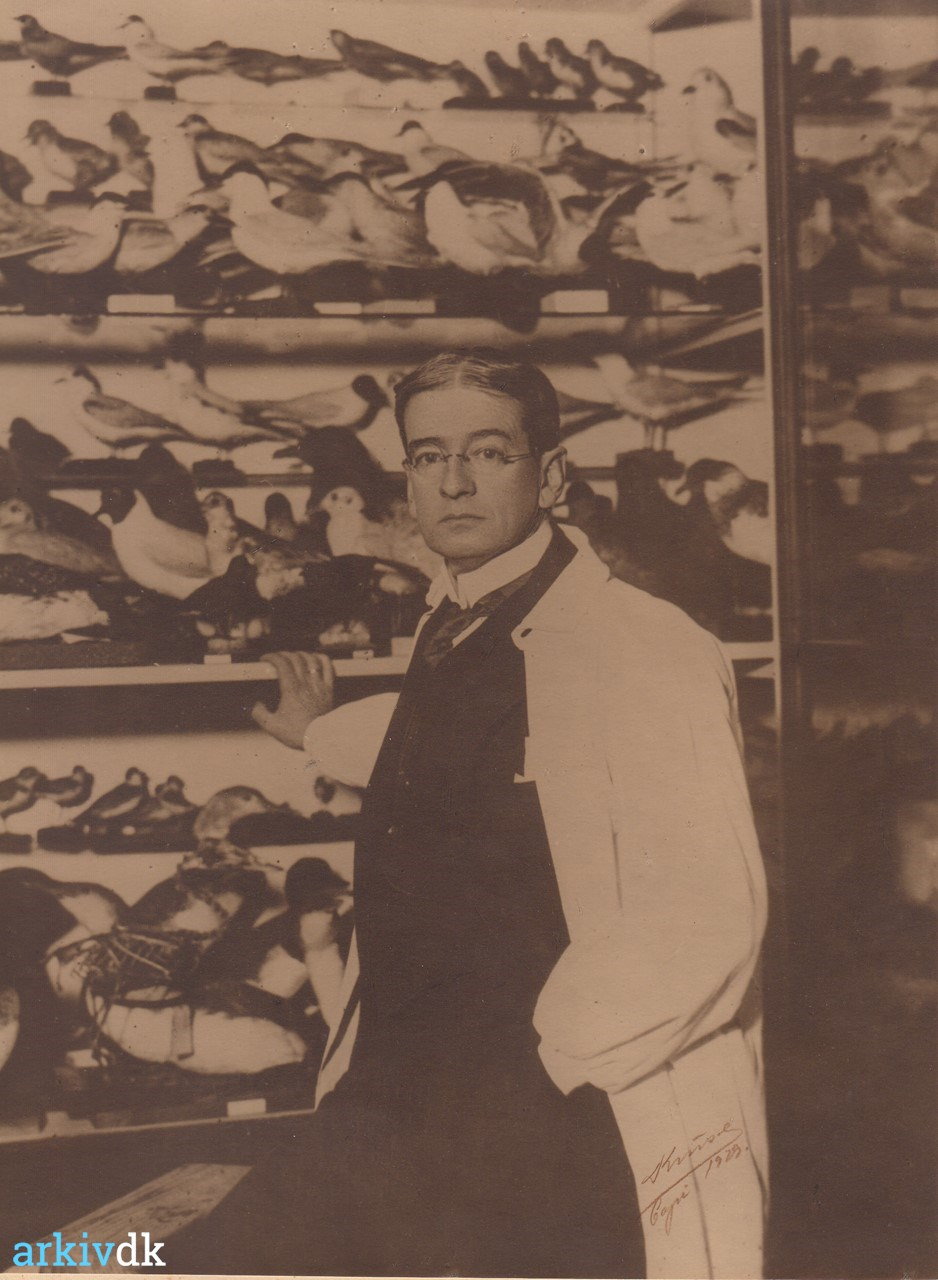
- Schiøler in 1925 with his Greenland bird collection. Photograph signed for his friend Johannes Larsen.
- Born: 30 October 1874; Frederiksberg, Denmark
- Died: 13 August 1929 (aged 54)
- Occupations: ornithologist, banker
- Known for: Danmarks Fugle

Eiler Lauritz Theodor Lehn Schiøler (30 October 1874 – 13 August 1929) was a Danish ornithologist and banker who came from a family of stockbrokers. He was the author of a major but incomplete multi-volume illustrated work on the birds of Denmark, Danmarks Fugle, published from 1925 to 1931. Schiøler was a co-founder, along with Hans Christian Cornelius Mortensen, of the Dansk Ornitologisk Forening (DOF, the Danish Ornithologists Association) and served as its first chair at the age of 32 upon foundation in 15 October 1906.

== Life ==
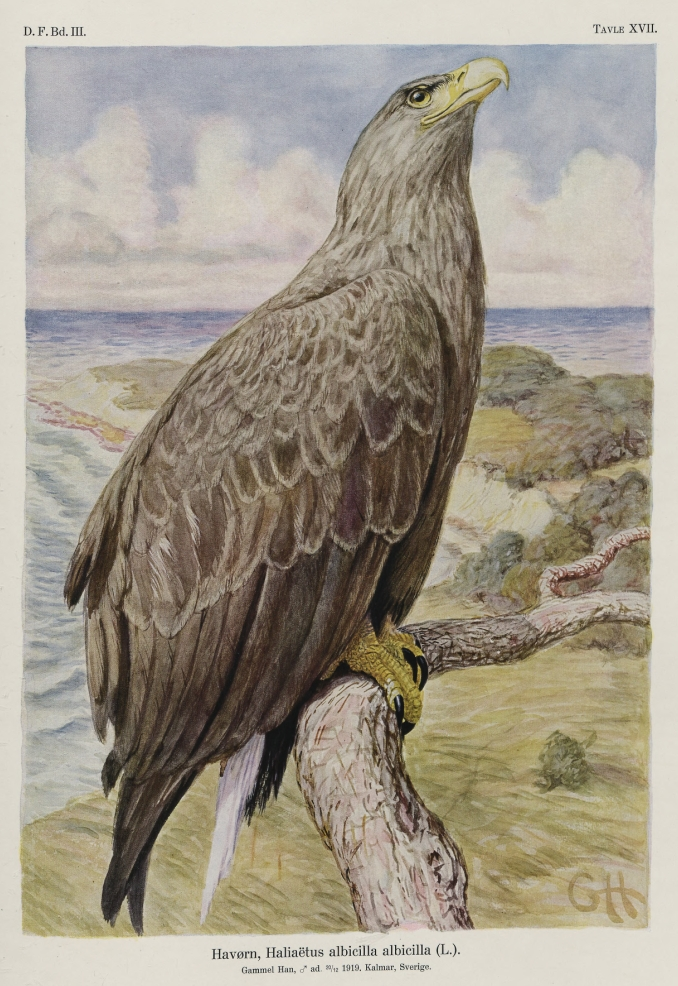
White-tailed sea-eagle by Gerhard Heilmann in volume 3 of Danmarks Fugle (1931)

Schiøler was born in Frederiksberg where he became interested in birds as a schoolboy in Herlufsholm under the influence of his teacher Margar Traustedt. He then went to the Metropolitan School and during this period, inspired by the zoological work of Herluf Winge, began to collect eggs and bird skins. His collections became so large, with 21,000 skins, 2,000 mounted specimens and 10,000 skeletons, that he needed a house next to his villa in Uraniavej in Copenhagen. He studied at the Brockske Business School and also went to train in banking in the United States. In 1906, following the death of his father, he became a partner in his father's company, the Landmandsbanken. In the same year, he was involved in founding the Dansk Ornitologisk Forening. In 1922 his company collapsed and went into liquidation and nearly all his wealth was wiped out. Schiøler had hoped to use his lost wealth in ornithology, but in any case he decided to continue his research and was supported by the Carlsberg foundation. In 1925 he organized an expedition to Greenland along with the artist Johannes Larsen and ornithologist Finn Salomonsen. He was one of the founding members of the Danish Ornithological Association, serving as its first chairman. After 1922 he started working on a major work on the birds of Denmark, Danmarks Fugle, but was able to publish only three. Schiøler was also a member of the Danish hunting organization (Dansk Jagtforening) but noted that they destroyed birds of prey and worked for changes in the hunting laws of 1922 in order to protect birds of prey. He helped organize the International Ornithological Congress held in Copenhagen in 1926. He took participants of the congress to his private collections at his home in Uraniavej. He showed symptoms of fatigue during the congress but in September he suffered a brain hemorrhage which paralyzed him and prevented him from speaking. All of his work came to an end, he was confined to bed and died in his sleep three years later. Schiøler married Ellen Dorothea, the adopted daughter of surgeon Peter Plum and after her death in 1921 he married Helga Jürgensen in 1924. He had six daughters and a son from his first marriage. His bird collection is now in the Danish natural history museum.

== Publications ==
Schiøler's magnum opus was his multivolume Danmarks Fugle which was projected for eight to ten volumes. They were expensive, costing 225 kronors a volume. He managed to complete only three before he was paralyzed in 1926. The third volume was published in 1931 after his death in 1929. The painting plates of birds were made by Johannes Larsen, Gerhard Heilmann, and Henning Scheel and the work has been considered a landmark in bird art.

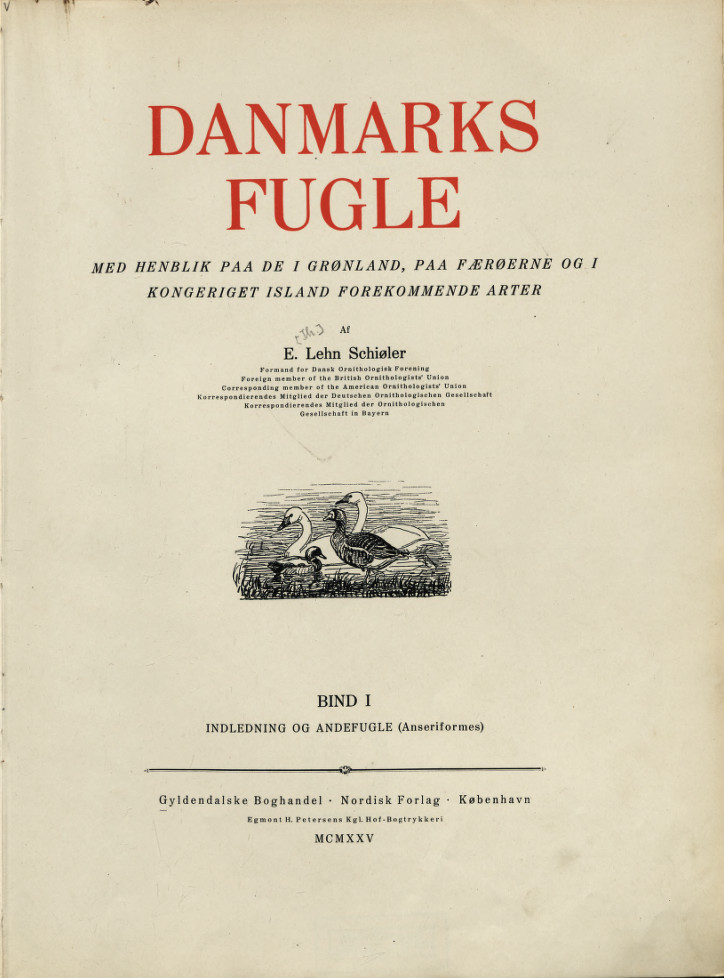
Band 1

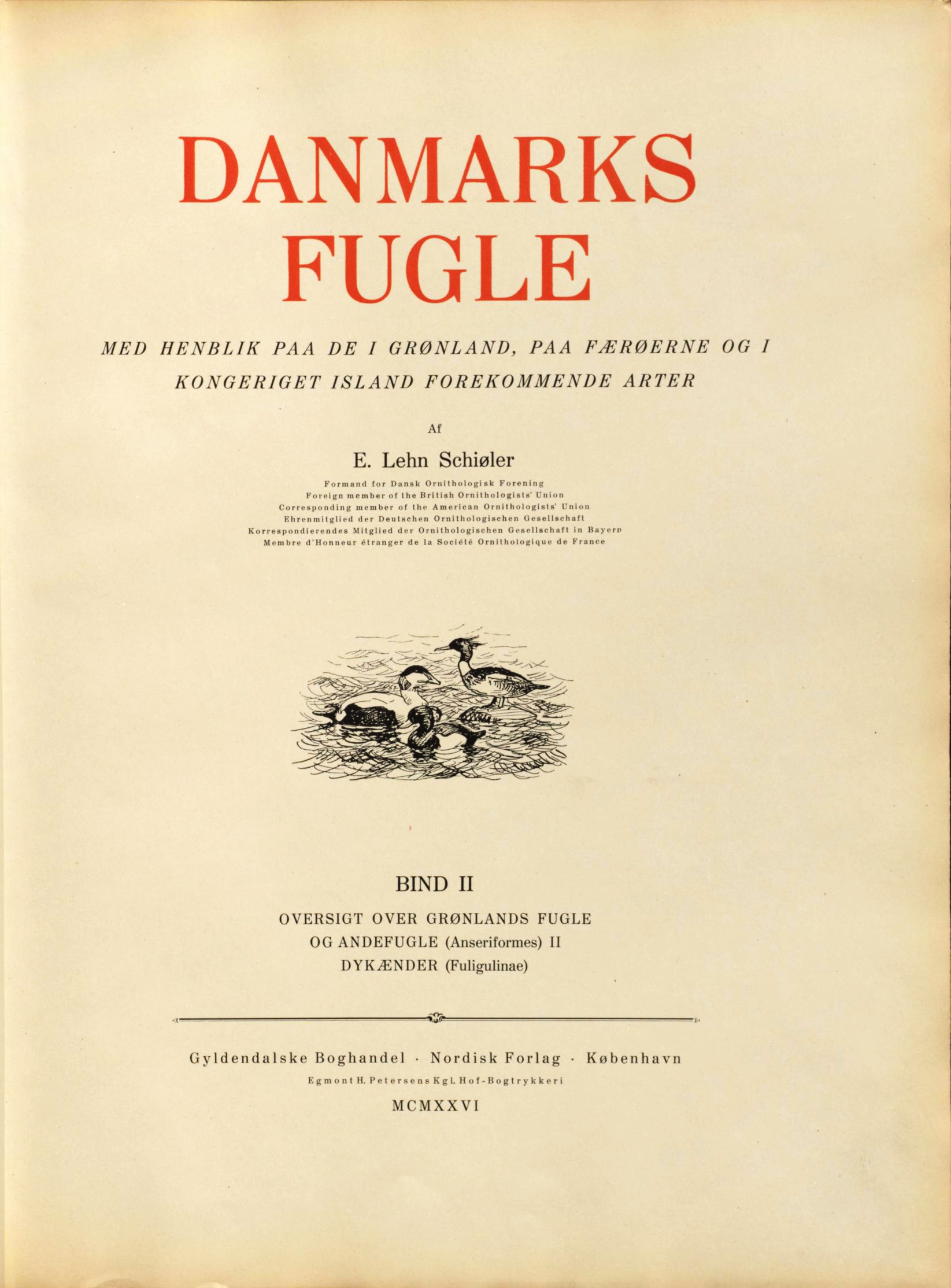
Band 2

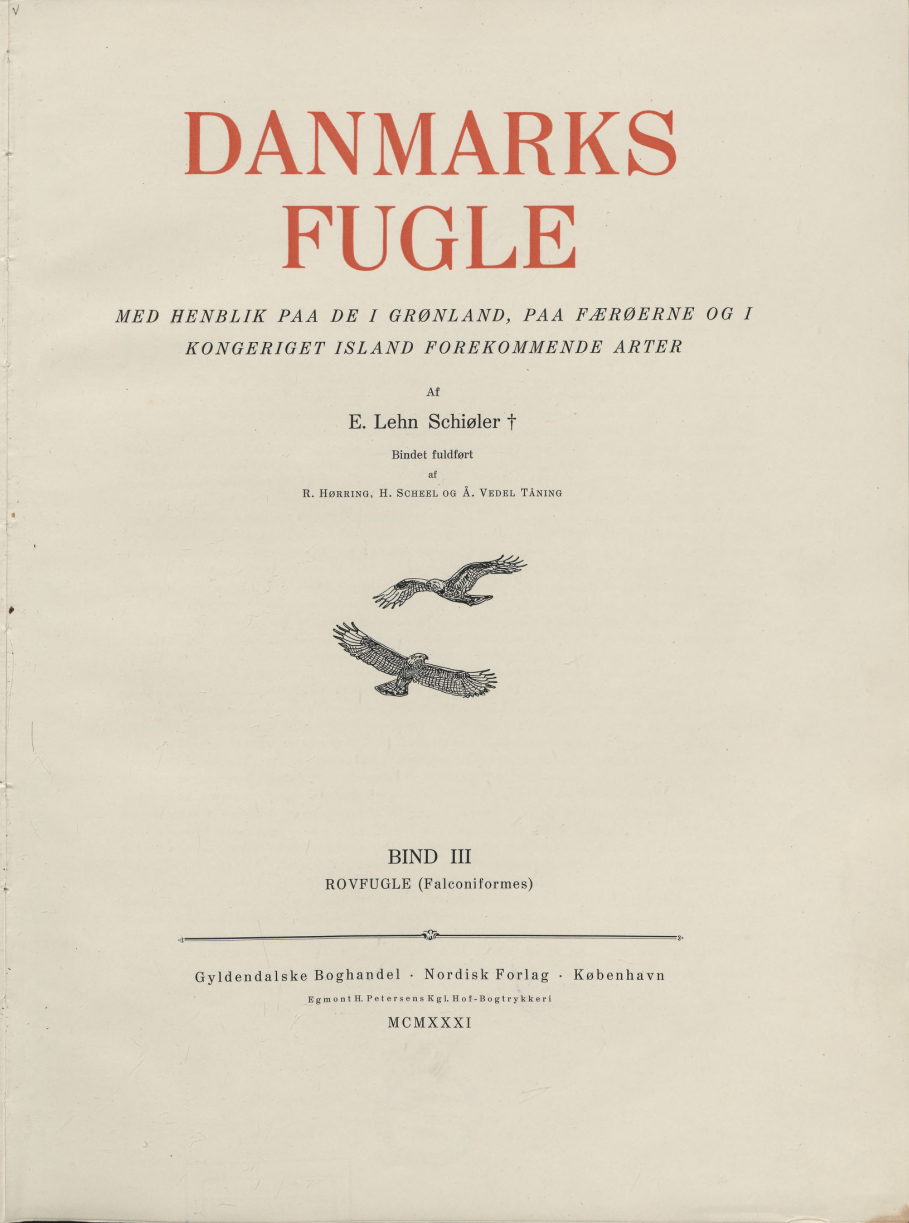
Band 3

Apart from his book, Schiøler published several scientific notes, the majority in the journal of the DOF, including:

- 1905. Om den grønlandske Stokand, Anas boscas spilogaster. Vid. Medd. fra den naturli. Foren., København, pag. 127—148. 3 Tvl. Tilføjelse. Ibid., pag. 239—40.
- 1906. Hvinand, Clangula glaucion americana Bp., ny for Grønland. Dansk ornith. Foren. Tidskr. 1, pag. 37—38.
- 1907. Om den ydre Forskel mellem Kønnene hos Pomerautsfuglen, Eudromias morinellus. Ibid. I, pag. 49—58. 1 Tvl.
- 1907. Dressers Ederfugl, Somateria mollissima Dresseri Sharpe, ny for Grønland. Ibid. I, pag. 164—167.
- 1907. Vandrixen, Rallus aquaticus L., ny for Grônland. Ibid. II, pag. 45—46.
- 1908—14. Lidt om Ederfuglen, Somateria mollisma L., og nogle af dens Racer. Ibid. II, pag. 109—149. 5 Tvl. VIII, pag. 233—276.
- 1911. Podicipes griseigena major Temm. & Schl. og Tringa maculata Vieill. skudte paa Island. Ibid. V, pag. 147—151.
- 1912. Om nogle for Gronlands Fuglefauna sjældne samt to nye Arter, Chaulelasmus streperus (L.) og Passerella iliaca (Merrem) typica. Ibid. VI, pag. 65—80.
- 1914. Om Forskellen mellem den danske Duehog og den typiske Astur palumbarius L. Ibid. VIII, pag. 93—112. 1 Tvl.
- 1915. Lidt om Præstekraven, Aegialitis hiaticula L., og dens Racer. Ibid. IX, pag. 161—181.
- 1918. Om Graasiskenens nordostlige Race, Cannabina linaria exilipes og Svane-gaasen, Anser cygnoides. Ibid. XII, pag. VI.
- 1919. Om den islandske Rodben (Totanus calidris robustus). Ibid. XIII, pag. 207—211.
- 1921. Sushkins Gaas, Anser neglectus Sush. truffen i Danmark. Ibid. XV, pag. 37—46. scan
- 1921. Bartrams Klire, Bartramia longicauda (Bechst.) ny for Danmark. Ibid. XV, pag. 46—47.
- 1921. A short description of the sequence of plumages in some palæarctic surface-feeding ducks. British Birds XV, pag. 130—138.
- 1922. Nogle Tilføjelser og Bemærkninger til Listen over Danmarks Fugle. Dansk ornith. Foren. Tïdsskr. XVI. pag. 1—55.
- 1924. Om de skandinaviske Ænder, deres Dragtskifte og Træk. Ibid. XVIII, pag. 85 - 95.
- 1925. Om de i Grønland forekommende Racer af Fjældrypen. Lagopus mutus mutus (Montin). Ibid. XIX, pag. 108—115.
- 1925. Om den vestgrônlandske Skallesluger, Mergus serrator major, subsp. nov. Ibid. XIX, pag. 115 -118.
- 1926. Om den islandske Kobbersneppe, Limosa limosa islandica Br. Dansk ornith. Foren. Tidskr. XX, pag. 11—12.
- 1926. Middelhavs-Skraape, Puffinus puffinus mauretanicus Lowe. ny for Danmark. Ibid. XX, pag. 13.
- 1926. Om den norske Sildemaage. Norsk ornithologisk Tidsskrift, Ser. 2, Nr. 5—7, pag. 53—55; Stavanger.
