= Dansk Ornitologisk Forening =

Danish non-profit organisation

Coordinates: 55.6707°N 12.5414°E

Dansk Ornitologisk Forening (DOF), also known as the Danish Ornithological Society or BirdLife Denmark, is a Danish non-governmental non-profit organisation. Founded on 15 October 1906 by Eiler Lehn Schiøler and Hans Christian Cornelius Mortensen, it is the principal bird study and conservation organisation in the country and the Danish partner of BirdLife International. It has about 12,000 members in 12 local branches and administers 18 bird reserves. It publishes the journal Dansk Ornitologisk Forenings Tidsskrift (Journal of the Danish Ornithological Society) and the magazine Fugle og Natur (Birds and Nature). DOF was responsible for establishing the network of volunteer caretaker groups that watch over Denmark's 128 Important Bird Areas, and in the designation of Special Protection Areas which have legal protection under the European Union.
