= Seute Deern (1939) =

Two-masted ketch

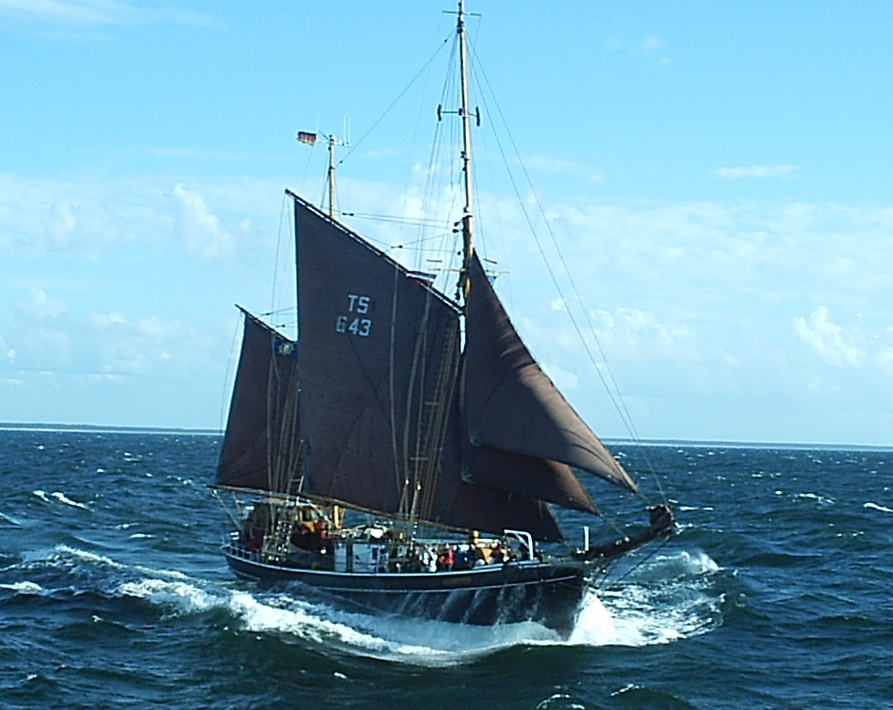
- Seute Deern in Tall Ships' Races 2009

History

Denmark
- Name: Havet
- Owner: Karl M. Lorenzen
- Builder: J. Ring-Andersen Skibsværft, Svendborg
- Home port: Svendborg

Denmark
- Name: Noona Dan
- Owner: J. Lauritzen
- Acquired: 1956
- Home port: Copenhagen

Germany
- Name: Seute Deern
- Owner: Deutsche Schulschiff-Verein
- Acquired: 1963
- Renamed: 1963
- Home port: Bremen

General characteristics
- Type: Gaff-rigged ketch
- Tonnage: 97 GRT, after 1963 105 GRT
- Length: 36 m (118 ft)
- Beam: 7.15 m (23.5 ft)
- Draught: 3.1 m (10 ft)
- Installed power: Volvo-Penta 290 PS
- Sail plan: 332 m^{2} (3,570 sq ft) gaff-rigged

Seute Deern (Low German for "Sweet girl") is a wooden, gaff-rigged ketch built as the cargo ship Havet (Danish for "The Sea") in Svendborg, Denmark in 1939 for Captain Karl Lorenzen. Sold in 1956 to J. Lauritzen and renamed Noona Dan. Noona Dan circumnavigated the world in 1961/1962 on the Danish research cruise known as the Noona Dan expedition to the Western Pacific Ocean. After the expedition the ship was sold to Germany as a training ship, first owned and operated by Deutsche Schulschiff-Verein and 1973 by the German Clipper association. She continues to sail with young people on training cruises in the Baltic Sea. In winter the ship is moored at Hamburg-Harburg.

== 1939–1963: Danish years ==
The ship was built and named Havet in 1939 at the J. Ring-Andersen shipyard in Svendborg, Denmark, for Captain Karl M. Lorenzen. It was designed according to his instructions, which were based on his experience with fishing from schooners in the waters off Alaska. The design was very successful and the hull design was used for several later ships from the shipyard. Havet sailed the next 16 years in coastal merchant trade. The ship was sold in 1957 to the Danish company D/S Ocean, part of the Lauritzen Group, Copenhagen, and renamed Noona Dan. The ship was refitted with a new engine, a 150-horsepower (110 kW), 3-cylinder B&W Alpha. In 1958 Noona Dan was sent to Greenland together with Netta Dan to conduct oceanographic and bathymetric measurements along the Liverpool Coast and Mestersvig, East Greenland. Lauritzen at the time had seven ships occupied with shipping ore from the newly opened lead and zinc mine in Mestersvig. Noona Dan arrived at Kap Tobin on 25 July 1958, but was surprised by the pack ice and had to seek shelter in Scoresbysund/Ittoqqortoormiit. The ship was trapped by the ice for the entire summer and forced to overwinter with only three crew members on board. The remaining crew and scientists were taken to Copenhagen by the ship Kista Dan.

=== Noona Dan Expedition ===
After the return to Copenhagen Lauritzen offered the ship at the disposal of University of Copenhagen for an expedition to the tropical western Pacific Ocean. Noona Dan and the expedition left Copenhagen on 10 April 1961 under command of captain Jørgen Kaas Narup. The goal of the expedition was the western Pacific Ocean, more specifically the many islands in the Solomon Sea and Bismarck Sea. The route went west, through the Panama Canal and across the Pacific Ocean. A large number of scientist were on board the ship and exchanged along the route. Four researchers shared the role as expedition leader consecutively: Børge Petersen, Mogens Køie, Finn Salomonsen and Torben Wolff.

In October 1961 the expedition suffered a loss on Tawitawi, as the ornithologist and taxidermist Erik Petersen died from an allergic reaction to an insect bite. This caused concern among the remaining participants of the expedition and several members announced that they would leave, unless the expedition was joined by a medical doctor. Lorenz Ferdinand was chosen — not only was he a medical doctor with experience from the Galathea expedition, but also a highly esteemed ornithologist. The return voyage went through the Suez Canal, which meant that upon arrival in Copenhagen on 9 December 1962, Noona Dan had circumnavigated the world, as the fourth Danish research vessel (the others being Galathea I, Dana and Galathea II).

== 1963–present: German training ship ==
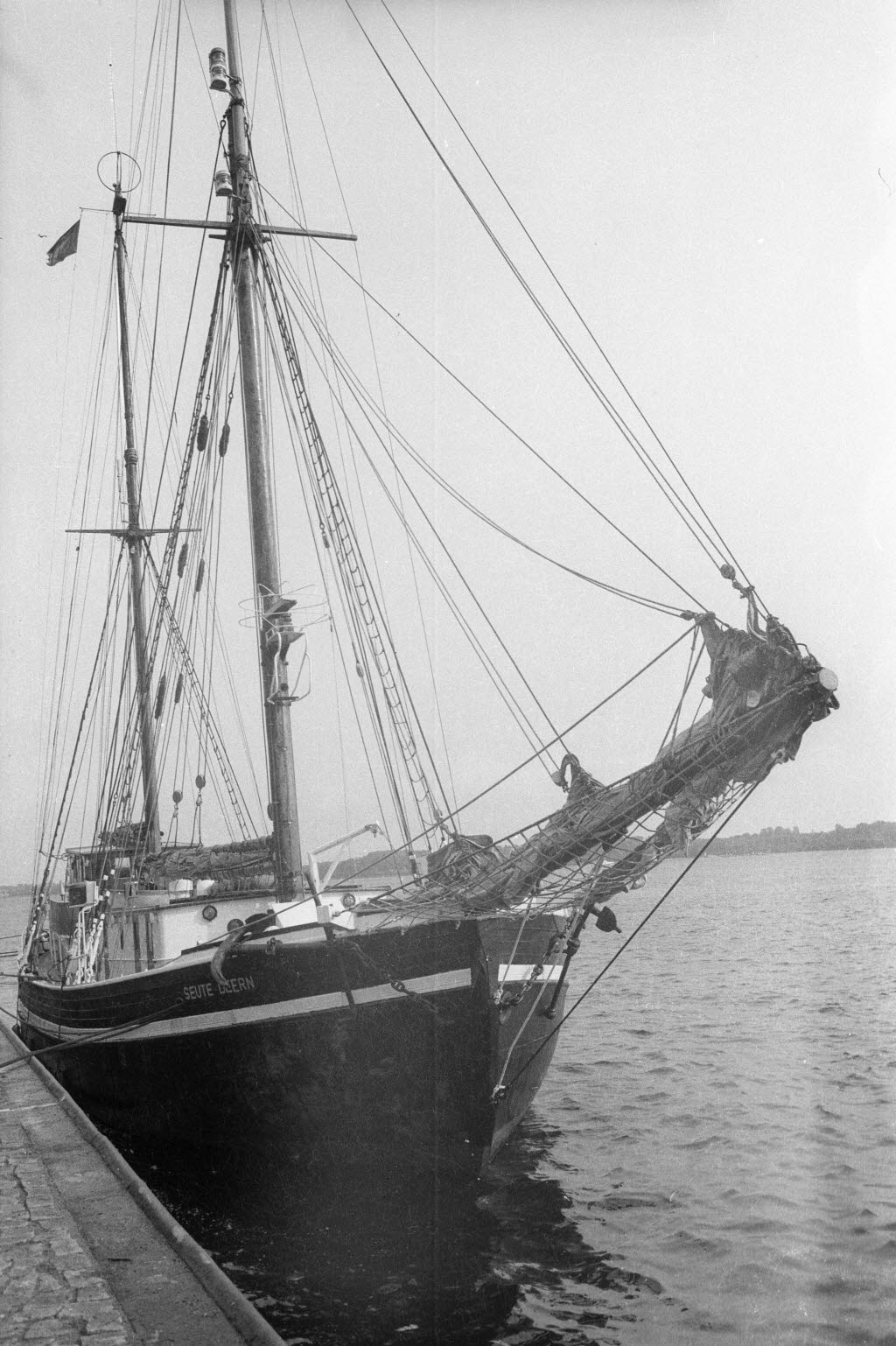
Seute Deern in Kiel, 1975

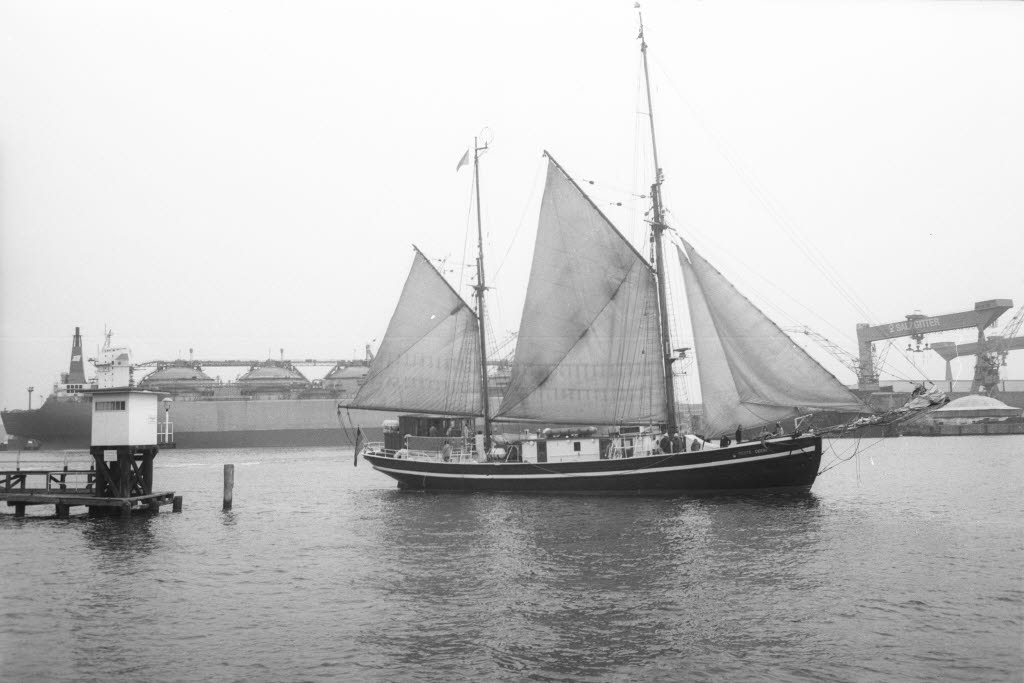
Seute Deern in Kiel, 1975

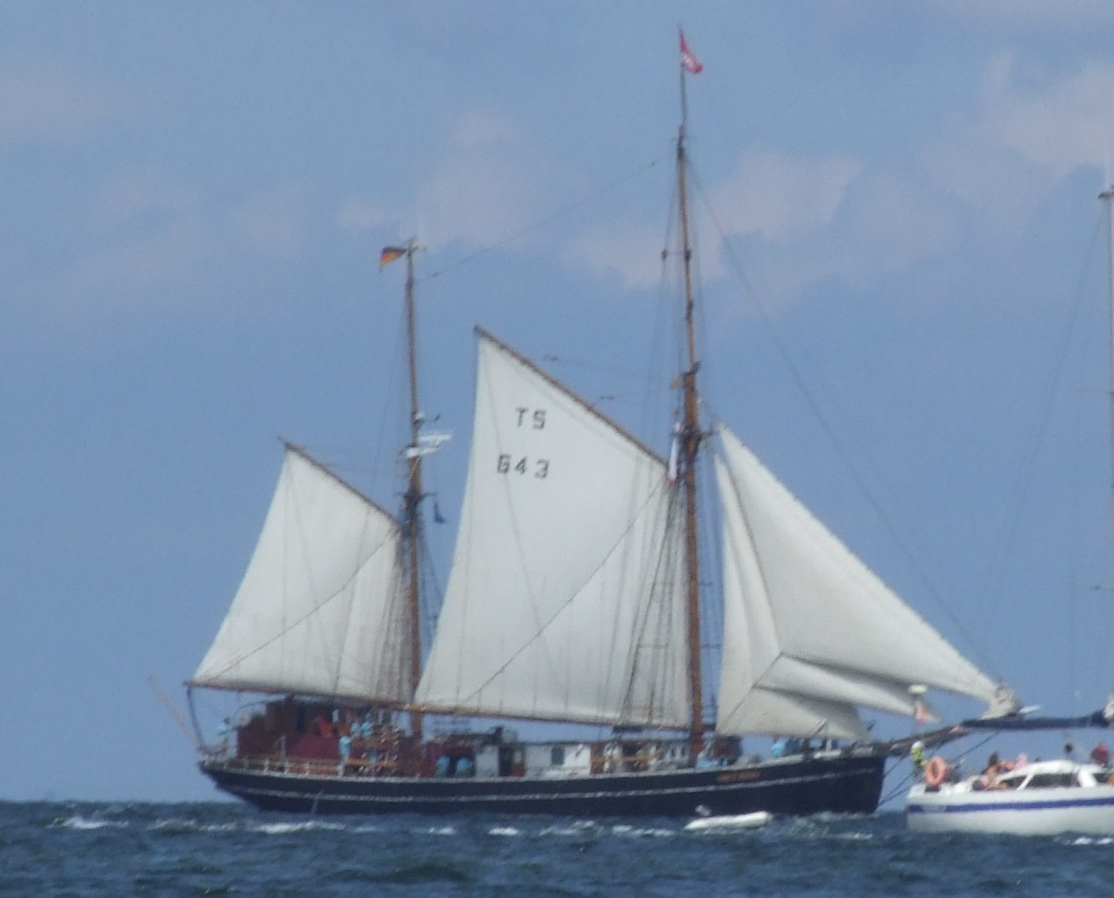
Seute Deern off Gdynia during 2009 Tall Ships' Races

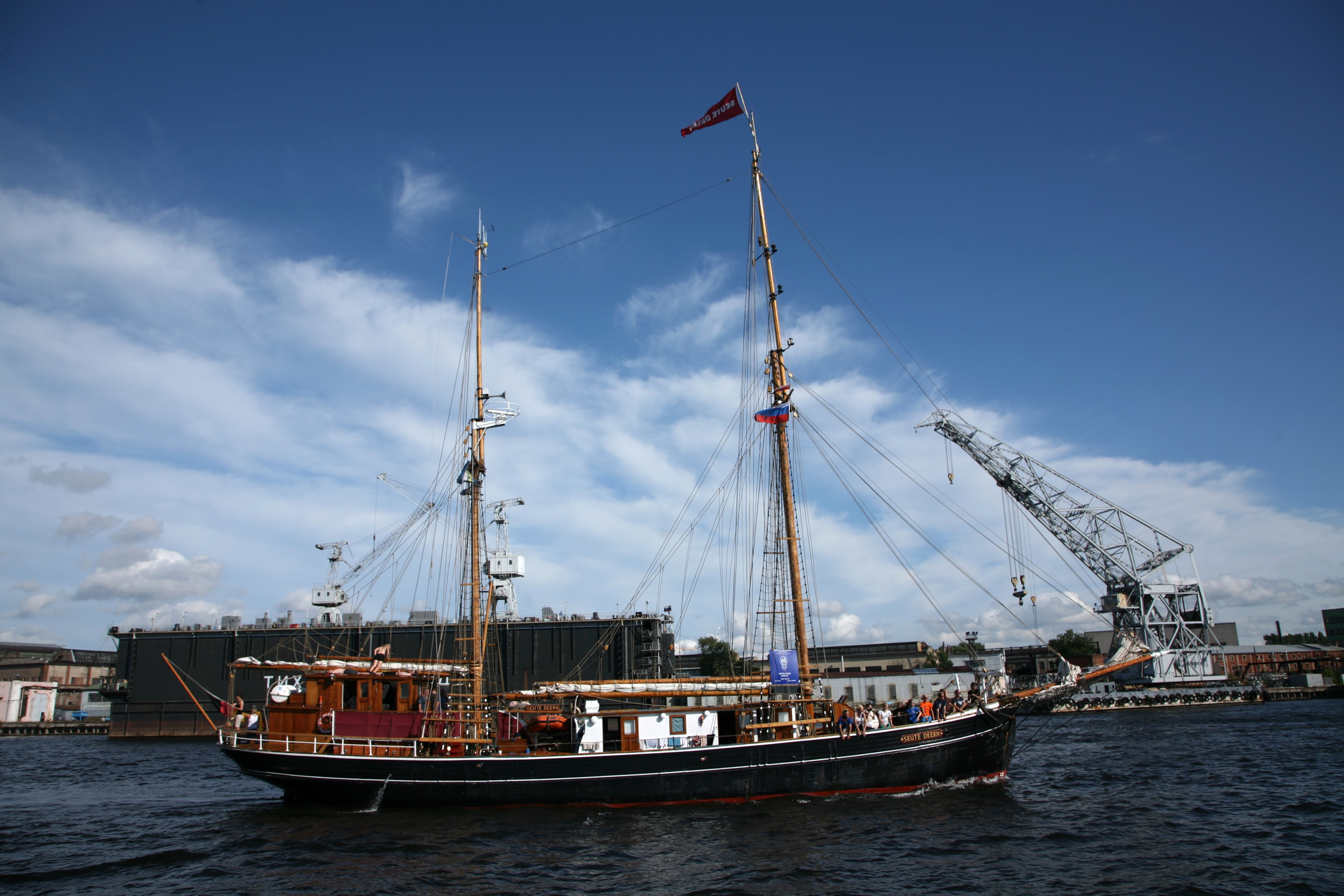
Seute Deern in St. Petersburg, Russia, during 2009 Tall Ships' Races

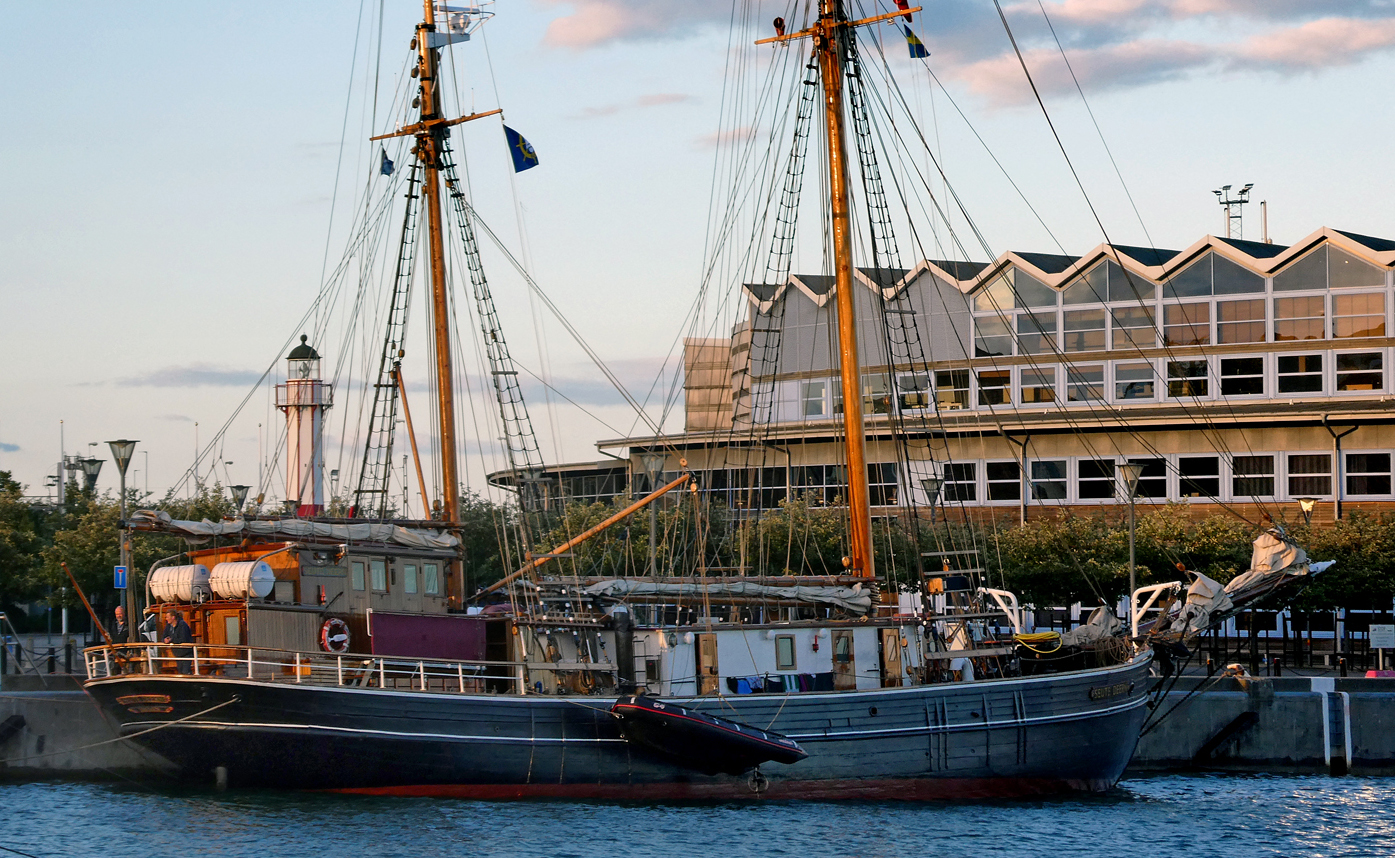
SS Seute Deern in the port of Ystad July 24, 2020.

In the early 1960s the German Training Ship Association were looking for a training ship and the interest fell on Noona Dan, as she had established herself as a very reliable and seaworthy ship. The ship was purchased in 1963 for a price of 14,000 Pound Sterling. The ship was renamed Seute Deern (sometimes Seute Deern II) after an earlier bark of the same name and entered as training ship under command of Captain Günter Ulrichs on the 30 April 1964. With some smaller breaks, the ship continued to serve as a training ship under different forms and ownership. In 2000 it was bought by Verein Clipper, which continues to operate the ship as training ship for young people on cruises mainly in the Baltic Sea.

== Literature ==
- Arvid Klemensen: Med Noona Dan in Sydhavet. Grafisk forlag, Copenhagen 1964, OCLC 15001875.
  - English translation: Arvid Klemensen (1965). Strange Island. The Noona Dan in the South Seas. London: Souvenir Press.
