= Hans Christian Cornelius Mortensen =

Danish teacher and ornithologist

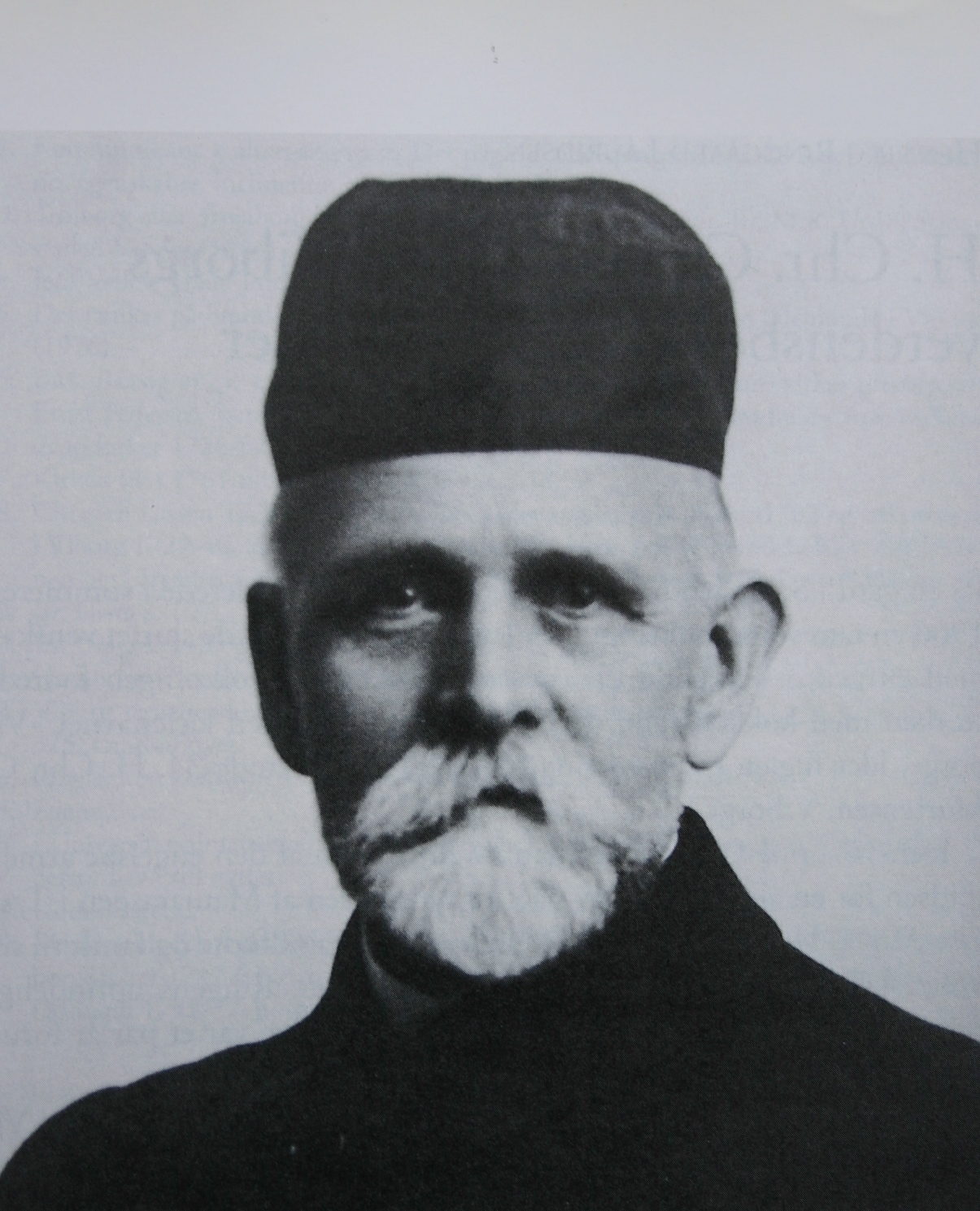
- Born: 27 August 1856; Jonstrup, Zealand, Denmark
- Died: 7 June 1921 (aged 64)
- Occupation: Teacher
- Known for: Ornithologist

Hans Christian Cornelius Mortensen (27 August 1856 – 7 June 1921) was a Danish teacher and ornithologist. He was the first to employ bird ringing for scientific purposes.

Mortensen was born in Jonstrup on the island of Zealand, Denmark. After completing secondary school in 1874 he began studies in theology and later in medicine and zoology at the University of Copenhagen without finishing any of these studies. He then worked as a schoolteacher at different schools in the Copenhagen area before, in 1888 and despite the lack of a university degree, became a master at the High School of Viborg in Jutland where he stayed for the rest of his life. From 1909 he held the post as a senior master. In 1891, he married Ingeborg Lemming (1858-1938), a fellow teacher and feminist who assisted him with his bird ringing. The couple had no children.

Mortensen's first successful experiments with bird ringing took place in 1899 with common starlings. Most were caught in nest boxes with an automatic closing mechanism. Later he also ringed white storks, herons, gulls and various species of duck. It is said that he personally ringed more than 6000 birds during his lifetime. He made most of his bird rings himself, cutting them from aluminium sheet and stamping each with an address and an individual number. From 1906, he received some financial assistance from the Carlsberg Foundation.

In 1906, he was a co-founder, with Eiler Lehn Schiøler, of the Danish Ornithological Society. In 1909, he was made a corresponding member of the Hungarian Ornithological Society.

Hans Christian C. Mortensen was a very distinctive character. As a teacher, he was both feared by and popular among his students. He went on field trips with students, something unusual at that time. He was also known as a keen piano and cello player.
