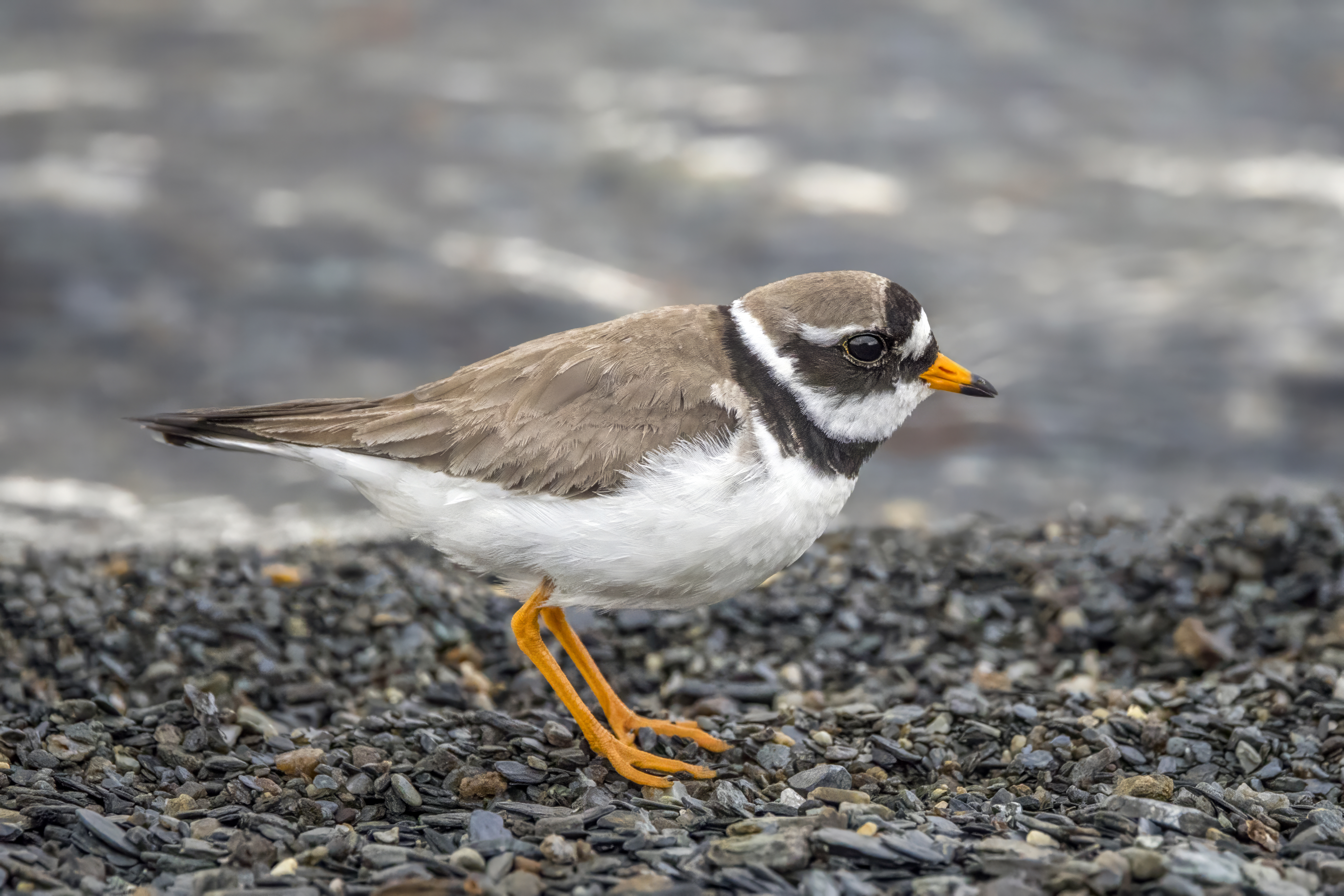
- Adult Calls recorded in Norfolk, England

Conservation status
- Least Concern (IUCN 3.1)

Scientific classification
- Kingdom: Animalia
- Phylum: Chordata
- Class: Aves
- Order: Charadriiformes
- Family: Charadriidae
- Genus: Charadrius
- Species: C. hiaticula

Binomial name
- Charadrius hiaticula Linnaeus, 1758

= Common ringed plover =

Species of bird

The common ringed plover, great ringed plover or ringed plover (Charadrius hiaticula) is a species of bird in the family Charadriidae. It breeds across much of northern Eurasia, as well as Greenland.

Common ringed plover foraging at the shoreline

== Taxonomy ==
The common ringed plover was formally described in 1758 by the Swedish naturalist Carl Linnaeus in the tenth edition of his Systema Naturae under the current binomial name Charadrius hiaticula. Linnaeus specified the type locality as "Europa & America" but this is now restricted to Sweden. The specific epithet hiaticula is late Medieval Latin for a plover.

Three subspecies are recognised:

- C. h. psammodromus Salomonsen, 1930 – Arctic of North Atlantic: Ellesmere Island and Baffin Island (northeast Canada, sporadic); Greenland, Iceland, Faroe Islands and Svalbard (north of Norway)
- C. h. hiaticula Linnaeus, 1758 – temperate east North Atlantic region: British Isles and northwest France to south Scandinavia and Baltic States
- C. h. tundrae (Lowe, 1915) – Arctic Ocean coasts, islands: north Scandinavia to Chukchi Peninsula (northeast Siberia) including Novaya Zemlya and New Siberian Islands (north of northwest, northeast Russia) and St. Lawrence Island (north Bering Sea; erratic)

The subspecies C. h. psammodromus is poorly differentiated from the nominate and is not recognised by some ornithologists.

== Description ==
Adults are 17–19.5 cm (6.7–7.7 in) in length with a 35–41 cm (14–16 in) wingspan. They have a grey-brown back and wings, a white belly, and a white breast with one black neckband. They have a brown cap, a white forehead, a black mask around the eyes and a short orange and black bill. The legs are orange and only the outer two toes are slightly webbed, unlike the slightly smaller but otherwise very similar semipalmated plover, which has all three toes slightly webbed, and also a marginally narrower breast band; it was in former times included in the present species. Juvenile ringed plovers are duller than the adults in colour, with an often incomplete grey-brown breast band, a dark bill and dull yellowish-grey legs.

This species differs from the smaller little ringed plover in leg colour, the head pattern, and the lack of an obvious yellow eye-ring.

== Distribution and habitat ==
The common ringed plover's breeding habitat is open ground on beaches or flats across northern Eurosiberia and in Arctic northeast Canada. Some birds breed inland, and in western Europe they nest as far south as northern France. They are commonly found both in low coastal plains and in cold uplands with sparse vegetation, in open habitats with little or no plant cover, where they nest on the ground.

Common ringed plovers are migratory and winter in coastal areas south to Africa. In Norway, geolocators have revealed that adult breeding birds migrate to West Africa. Many birds in Great Britain and northern France are resident throughout the year.

== Behaviour and ecology ==
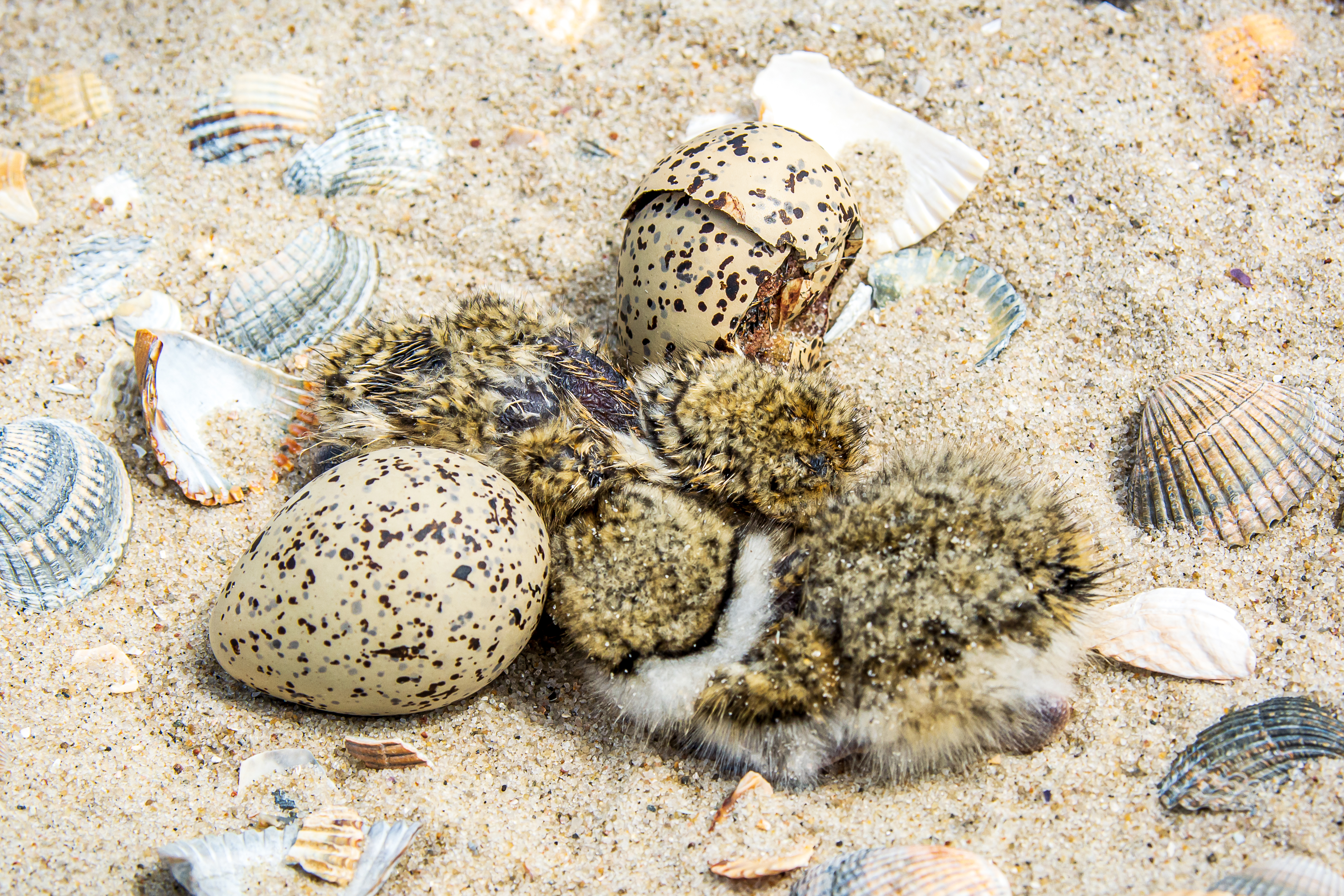
Eggs and newly hatched chicks

=== Breeding ===
Common ringed plovers breed from one year of age. They are seasonally monogamous and the pair-bond is sometimes maintained from one year to the next. They are solitary nesters and are territorial. Egg laying generally begins in May but the date varies depending on the region. The nest is a shallow scrape lined with pebbles and pieces of vegetation. The clutch is of 3 to 4 eggs. The eggs are laid of intervals of 1 to 3 days and are incubated by both parents beginning after the last or penultimate egg. They hatch after 21 to 27 days. The downy chicks are grey-buff mottled with cinnamon-buff above and white below. The young are precocial and nidifugous. They are cared for by both parents and can feed themselves. While small they are brooded at night and in bad weather. They fledge when aged around 24 days.

If a potential predator approaches the nest, the adult will walk away from the scrape, calling to attract the intruder and feigning a broken wing.

=== Food and feeding ===
These birds forage for food on beaches, tidal flats and fields, usually by sight. They eat insects, crustaceans and worms and forage both by day and by night. They sometimes use foot-trembling to reveal location of prey.

== Conservation status ==
The common ringed plover has an extremely large range with a large population size and is therefore evaluated by the International Union for Conservation of Nature to be of "Least Concern". The common ringed plover is one of the taxa to which the Agreement on the Conservation of African-Eurasian Migratory Waterbirds (AEWA) applies.

== Gallery ==
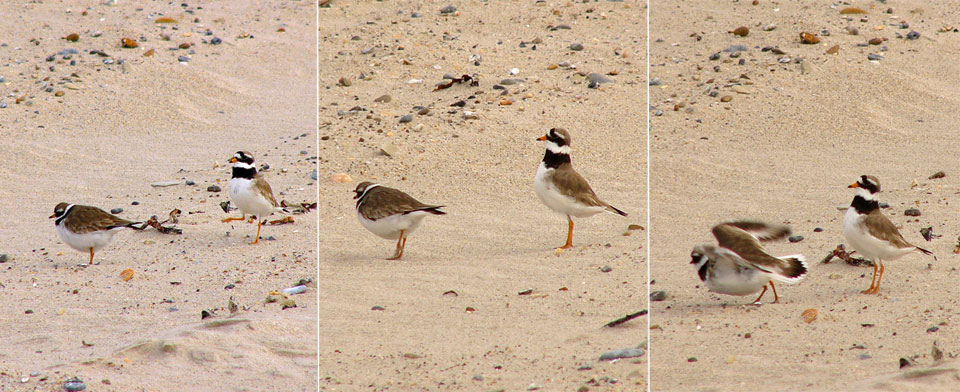
Mating behaviour

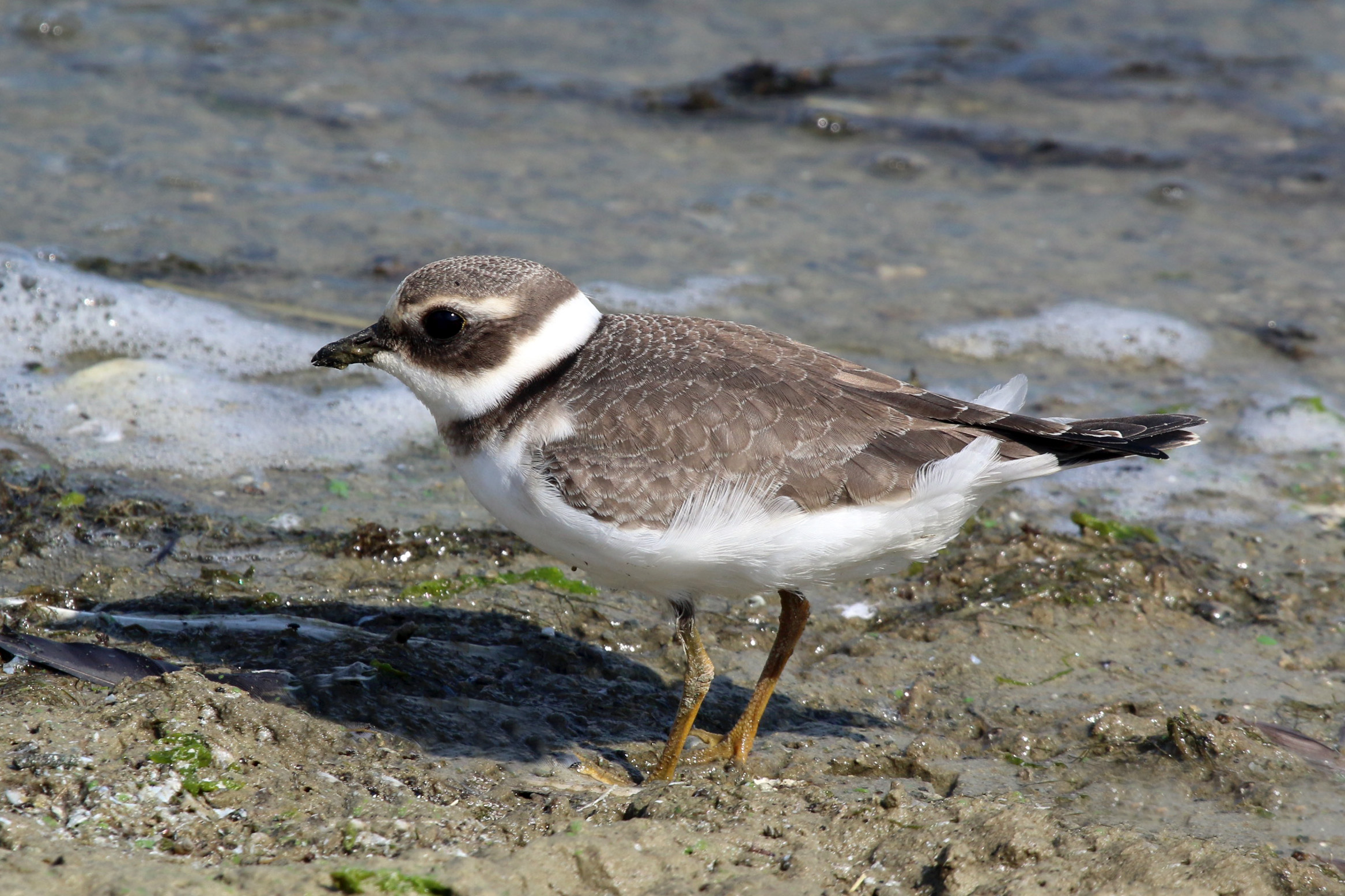
Juvenile

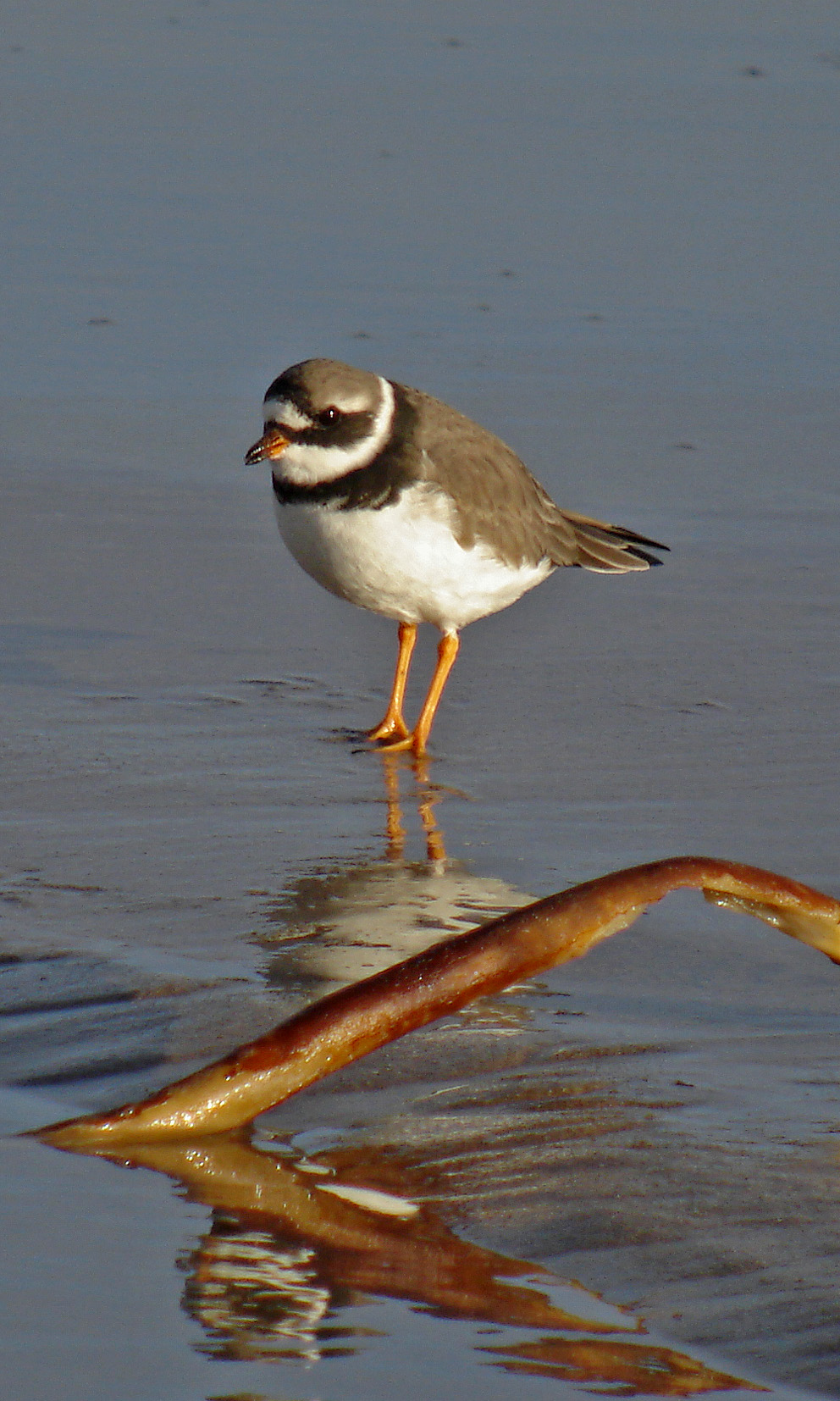
Adult

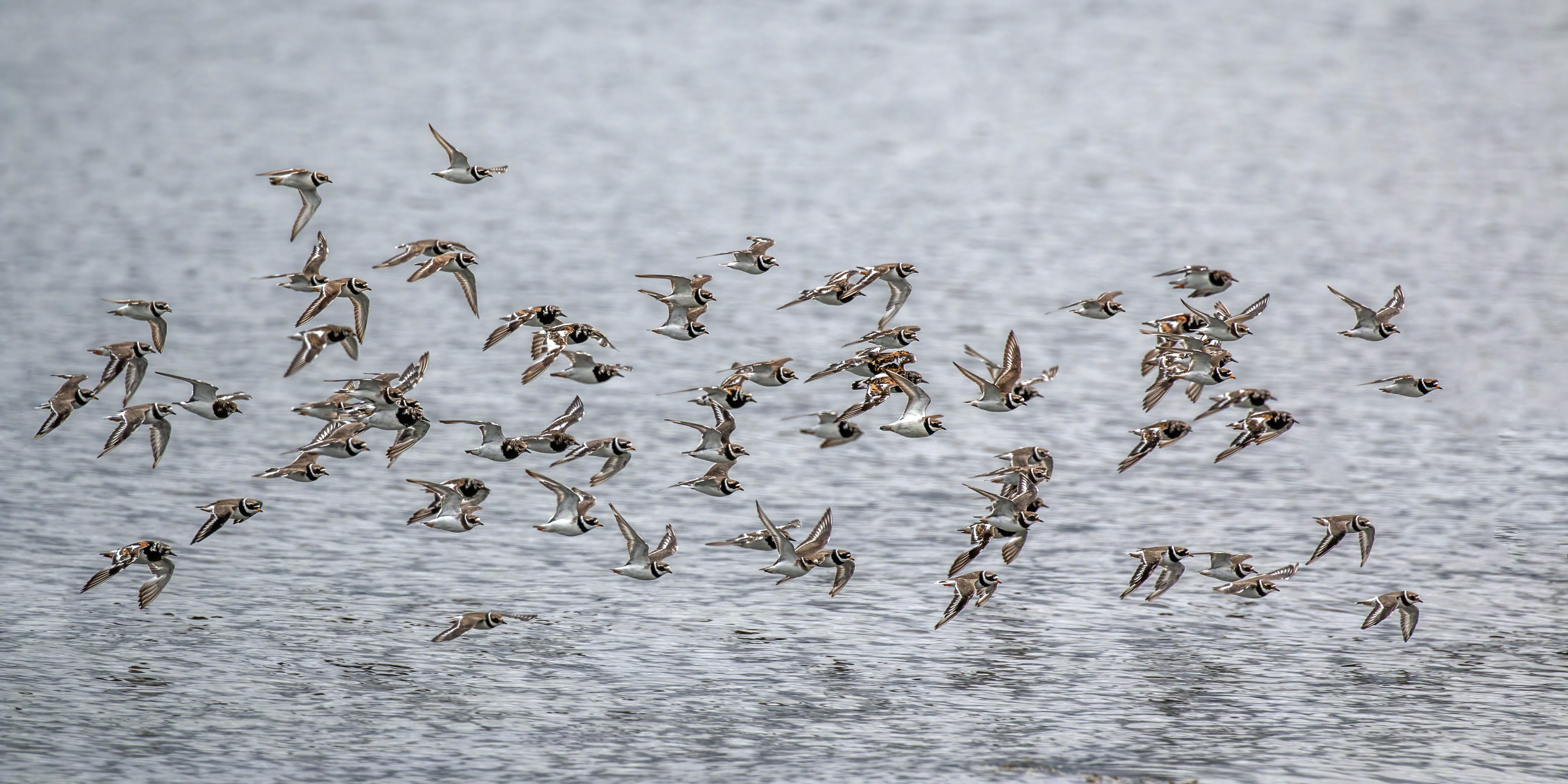
Flock in flight, with ruddy turnstones

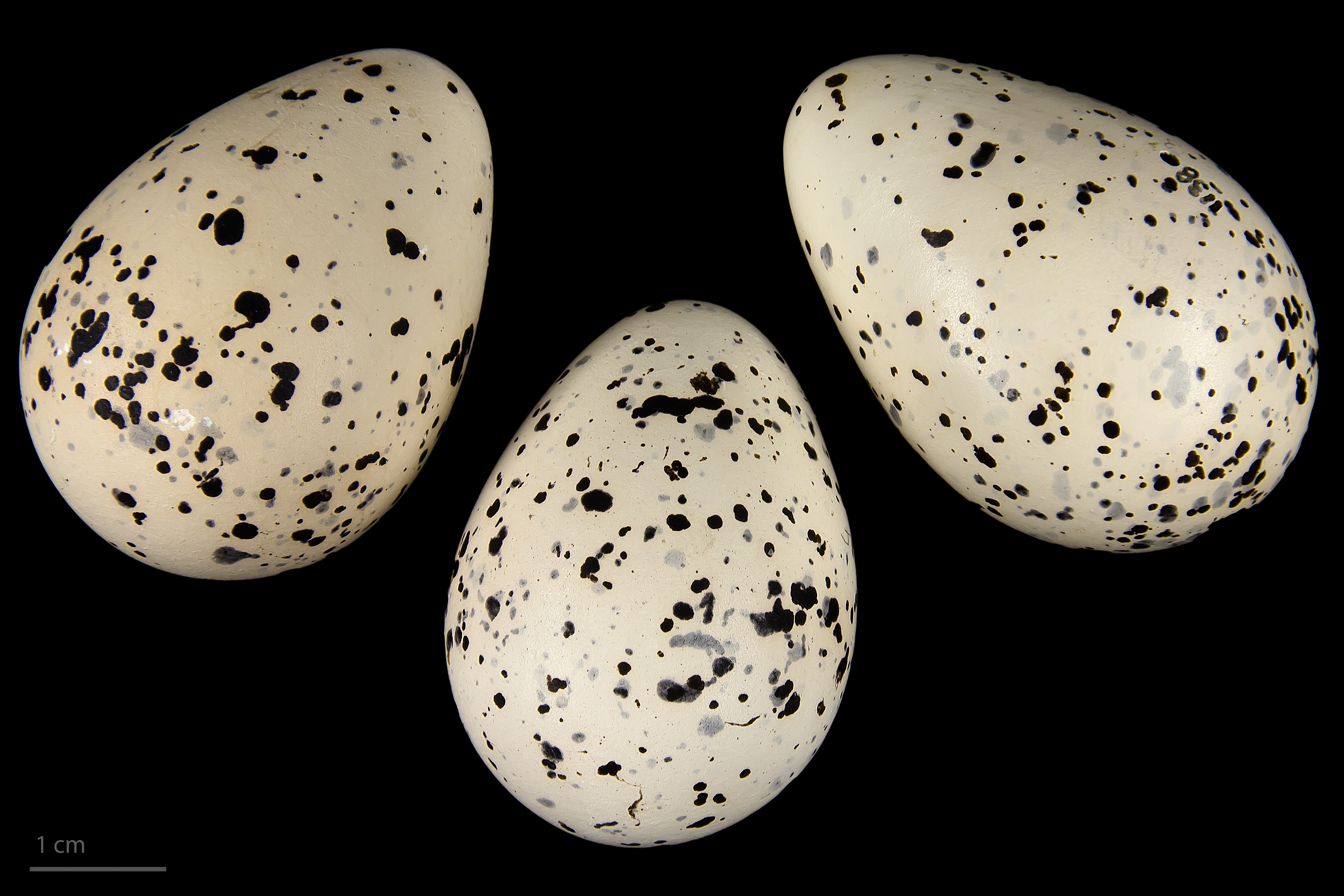
Charadrius hiaticula hiaticula - MHNT

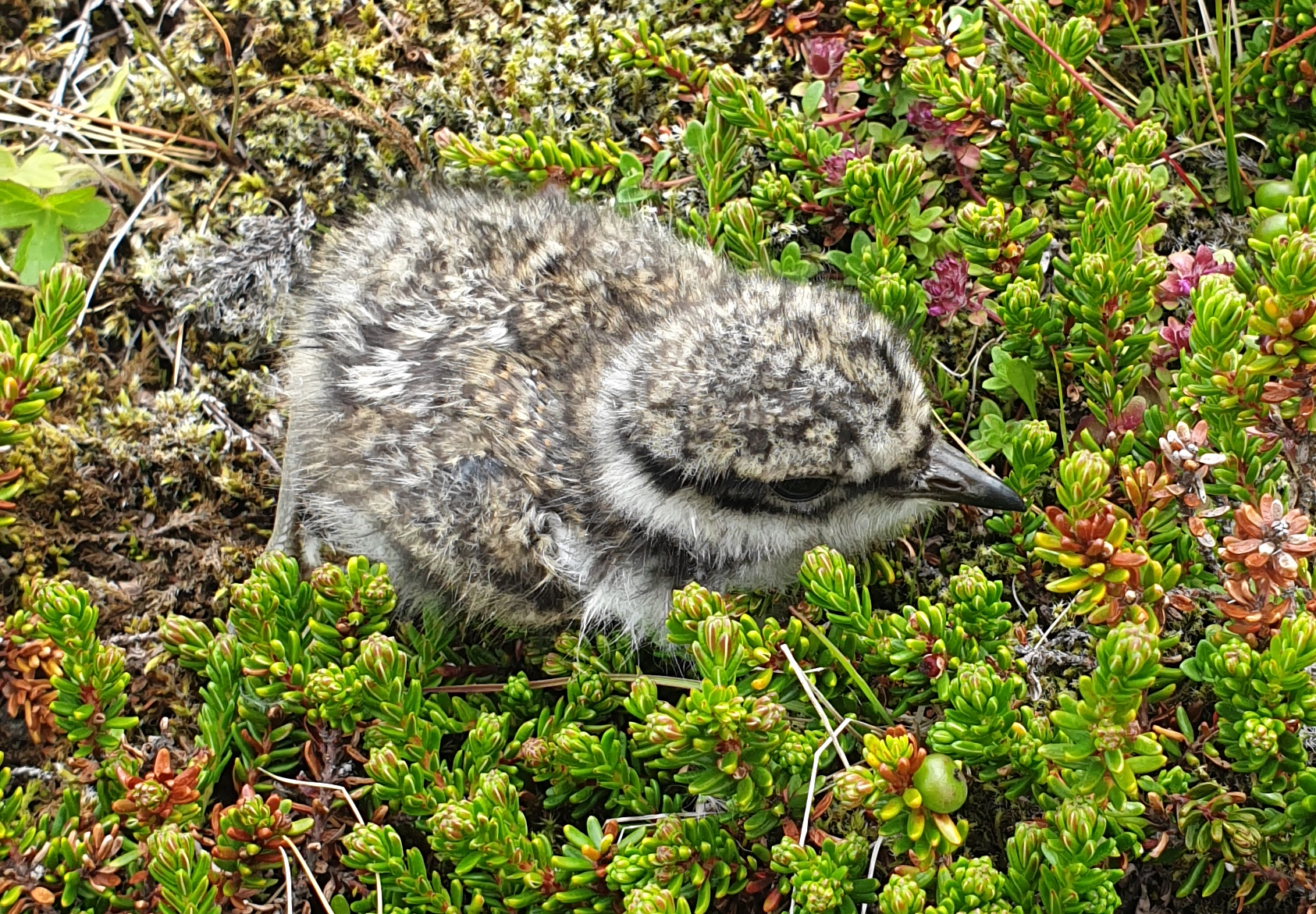
Charadrius hiaticula chick in Iceland

== Sources ==
- Cramp, Stanley, ed. (1983). "Charadrius hiaticula Ringed Plover". Handbook of the Birds of Europe the Middle East and North Africa: The Birds of the Western Palearctic. Vol. III: Waders to Gulls. Oxford: Oxford University Press. pp. 129–141. ISBN 978-0-19-857506-1.
