= Dana (1919 ship) =

Research ship built in 1919

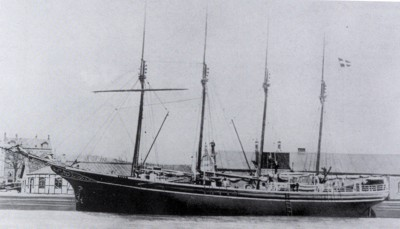
- Dana

History

Denmark
- Name: Dana (I)
- Owner: East Asiatic Company
- Port of registry: Copenhagen
- Builder: Nakskov, Denmark
- Yard number: 8
- Completed: April 1919
- In service: 1919
- Out of service: 1924
- Identification: Call sign: NWMJ; IMO: 3007090

Sweden
- Name: Carina
- Owner: Lloyd-Lundstrøm
- Port of registry: Helsingborg
- In service: 1924
- Out of service: 1932

Norway
- Name: Carina
- Owner: A/S Carina
- Port of registry: Mandal
- In service: 1932
- Out of service: 1935

Italy
- Name: Giuseppina V
- Owner: Pietro Rosetti
- Port of registry: Genoa
- In service: 1935
- Out of service: 1941
- Fate: Sunk in bombardment of Tripoli

General characteristics
- Type: Four-masted schooner
- Tonnage: 362 GRT / 238 NRT
- Length: 135 ft (41 m)
- Beam: 30 ft (9.1 m)
- Draught: 12.7 ft (3.9 m)
- Propulsion: 3 cyl. Tuxham Diesel, 200 hp, single propeller
- Speed: 7 knots

Dana was a four-masted motor schooner built for the Danish East Asiatic Company (EAK) and launched in 1919. It was made available to the Danish marine biologist Johannes Schmidt, who used it for two expeditions to the Sargasso Sea in 1920–1921. The main goal of the expeditions, named the first and second Dana expeditions, was searching for the spawning grounds of the European eel.

The ship was returned to service in EAK after the expeditions and sold to Sweden in 1924, where it was renamed to Carina. Later sold to Italy (1934) and renamed Giuseppina V, it was lost 30 August 1941 during the bombing of Tripoli.

Dana was succeeded by the research vessel Dana (II).
