= HDMS Ingolf (1876) =

Danish steam ironclad

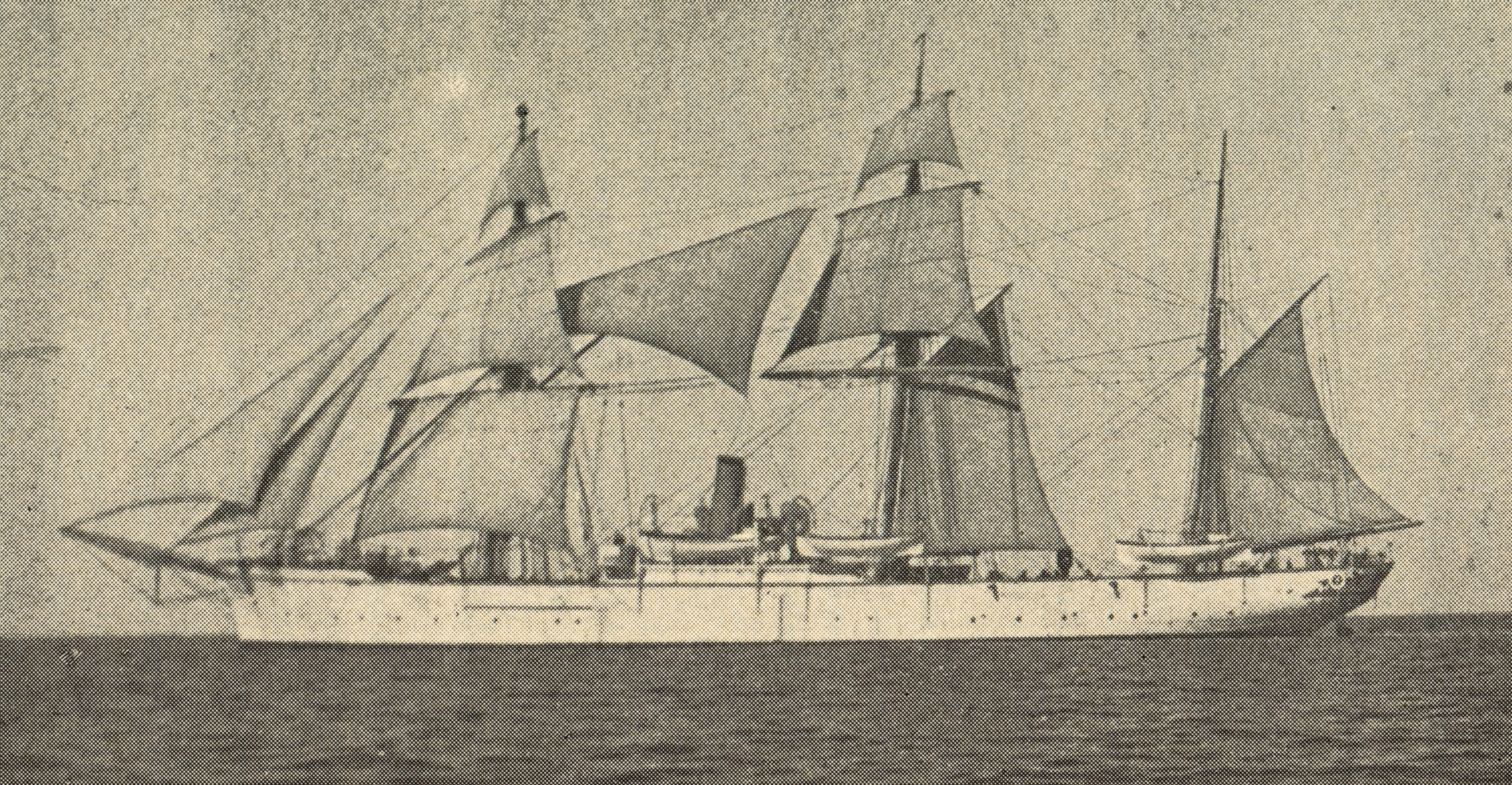
- Ingolf under full sails

History

Denmark
- Name: Ingolf
- Builder: Royal Naval Shipyard, Copenhagen
- Launched: 1 Sept 1876
- Commissioned: 1878
- Decommissioned: 23 Oct 1926
- Home port: Copenhagen
- Fate: Broken up in Marstal in 1926

General characteristics
- Type: 3-masted iron gunboat
- Displacement: 1,012 tons
- Length: 63.9 m (209 ft 8 in)
- Beam: 8.53 m (28 ft 0 in)
- Draught: 4.16 m (13 ft 8 in)
- Propulsion: 630 hp (470 kW) steam engine R. Napier & Sons
- Speed: 10.2 knots (18.9 km/h; 11.7 mph)
- Complement: 125
- Armament: 1876: 3 15 cm cannons; 2 37 mm revolver cannons; 1885: 2 15 cm cannons; 4 87 mm cannons; 2 37 mm revolver cannons; 1893: 4 12 cm cannons; 4 37 mm revolver cannons; 1906: 2 12 cm cannons, 2 57 mm cartridge guns; 4 37 mm revolver cannons; 1910: 4 57 mm cartridge guns; 5 machine guns

HDMS Ingolf was a Danish schooner-rigged steam gunboat build in iron and launched in 1876. Ingolf marks a transition between the traditional gunships with muzzle-loading cannons placed along the sides of the ship and modern breechloading and turning guns placed in the centerline of the ship. The guns on Ingolf were breechloading guns from Krupp in Germany. The steam engine was British and could deliver 650 HP. The propeller could be hoisted up into a well on the underside of the ship, so as not to slow down the ship when she went for sails. Ingolf undertook a large number of voyages, often in the North Atlantic (Faroes, Iceland and Greenland) in summer and the Danish West Indies in winter. From 1897 Ingolf also served as training ship for non-commissioned officers and cadets. During World War I Ingolf was part of the Danish alerted fleet (not a true mobilization, as Denmark was neutral during the war). The last voyage as a training ship was in 1922 and went to the Mediterranean. Decommissioned in 1926 and sold for scrap.

== Ingolf expedition ==
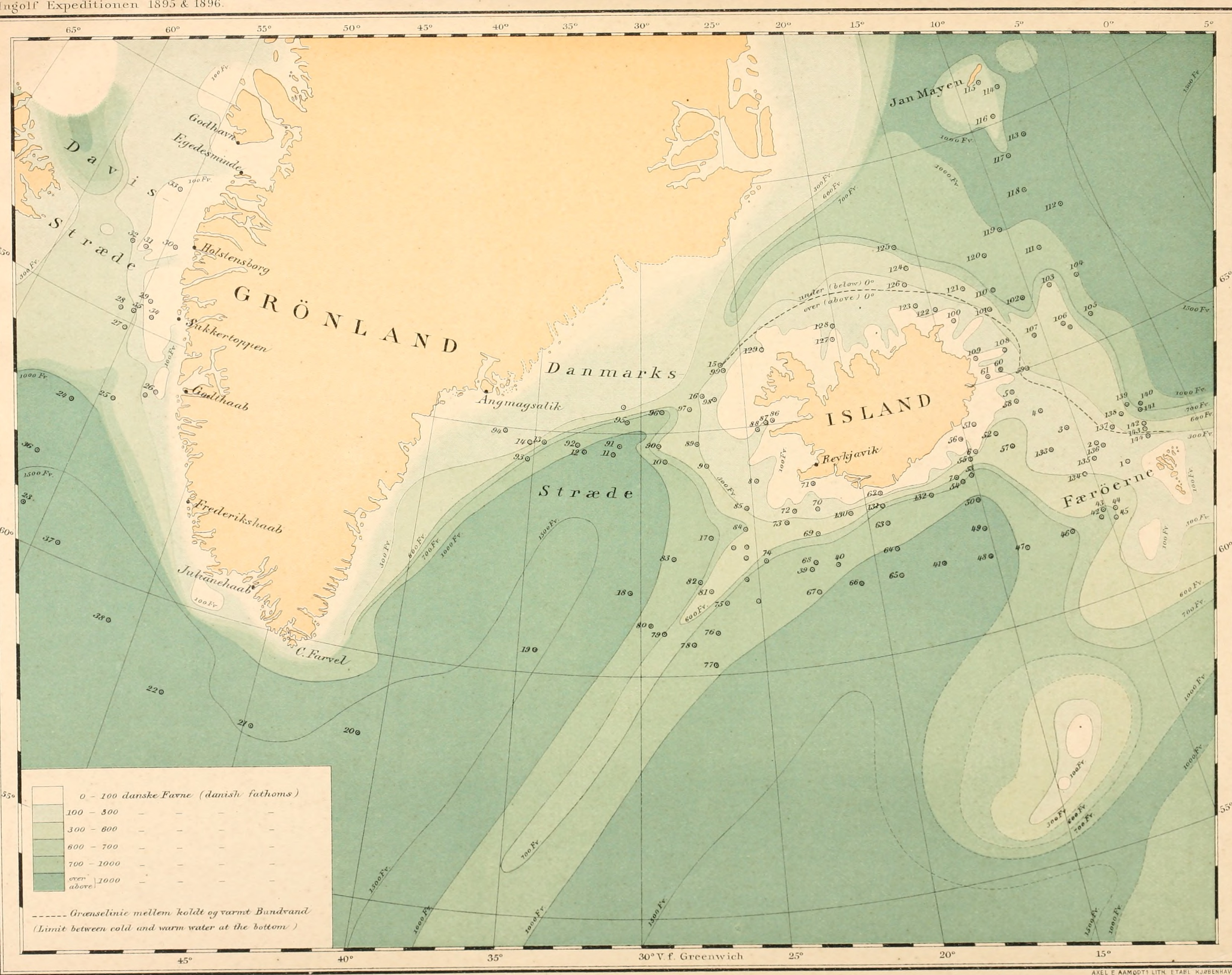
Map created from data collected by the Ingolf Expedition

Ingolf was used for two oceanographic expeditions during the summer months of 1895 and 1896, collectively known as the Ingolf Expedition. The cruises were financed by the Danish Government and had the objective of studying the bathymetry around Iceland, northwards toward Jan Mayen and off West Greenland, heavily inspired by the Challenger expedition and similar American and German expeditions. Commander both years was the experienced captain C.F. Wandel and scientific crew consisted of three zoologists (Hector Jungersen, William Lundbeck, and H.J. Hansen, replaced in 1896 by Carl Wesenberg-Lund), one botanist (Carl H. Ostenfeld) and one hydrographer (Martin Knudsen). Despite severe weather and ice conditions thousands of hydrographical measurements were taken and biological samples collected at a total of 144 stations, down to depths of 3500 meter. The results are published in the impressive report The Danish Ingolf-Expedition' (1899–1942, 5550 pages and 333 plates). The most significant results were the demonstration of two different bottom faunas separated by the Wyville Thomson Ridge south of the Faroe Islands and the systematic difference in temperature of the water at the sea floor between the north and south side of the ridge; and the very large number of small crustaceans collected by means of H.C. Hansen's method of filtering the bottom mud with fine silk gauze rather than a metal sieve. A very large number of species of micro-crustaceans were thus described for the first time based on the material collected by the Ingolf expedition.
