= Dana expeditions =

Danish research expeditions

The Dana expeditions were four Danish research expeditions from 1920 to 1930. The first two were undertaken by the Dana I and the third by the Dana II. They were funded in part by the Carlsberg Foundation and led by Johannes Schmidt. The first three expeditions took place from 1920 to 1922 and the fourth and final was from 1928 to 1930. They centered around investigating the breeding of eels. The first two expeditions allowed Schmidt to prove his theory that European eels migrate to the Sargasso Sea to spawn. The final expedition traveled to the Indian Ocean and gathered numerous samples.

== First expeditions (1920–1922) ==
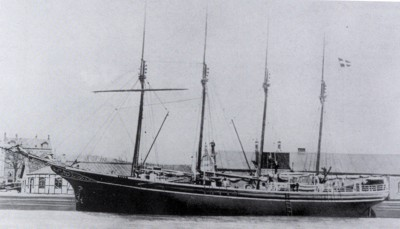
Dana I

=== Planning ===
From 1920 to 1922, a series of three expeditions were led by the marine biologist Johannes Schmidt. Schmidt and C. F. Dreschel had first proposed an expedition that would explore the deep sea of the Atlantic Ocean in 1916. Although the two men originally envisioned a single large expedition, in January 1917 Schmidt had suggested instead running two expeditions with the first focusing on the Atlantic and the second circumnavigating the world over the course of two years. The two decided to focus first on the Atlantic and began planning and purchasing supplies for it, an endeavor that was complicated by the ongoing First World War and Schmidt's battle with bronchitis. By early 1918 they had gathered the bulk of necessary supplies. Schmidt continued to emphasize that he felt an attempted circumnavigation worthwhile, particularly for the attention it could generate at a comparable cost. Such an expedition also held the potential to increase the prestige of Danish marine science dramatically, as the Challenger expedition did for the UK. His efforts to convince Dreschel to refocus the planned expedition, although they continued into 1919, were unsuccessful.

In January 1919 it was agreed that the first expedition would leave Gibraltar in March for a three month expedition. Upon the end of the First World War in November 1919, the first expedition was almost set to begin, as the Dana had been completed by H.N. Andersen's East Asiatic Company. Andersen had agreed to loan Schmidt and Dreschel the vessel for their expedition and fund its operation for a three month period, but launching was delayed until 1920 so that equipment could be purchased at more reasonable prices. (Note: It was named Dana upon the insistence of Andersen, who opposed naming it after Valdemar in favor of Dana or Dania, as he felt it would "underline the national character of the enterprise".) In the interim Dana was used by the company to ship freight. Next, Schmidt and Dreschel decided on an 'executive committee' for the expedition, which they determined would have Prince Valdemar of Denmark as the figurehead, include a representative from the Carlsberg Foundation board of directors and include many other prominent Danes. The expedition was announced to the public in the summer of 1919. After the announcement, Schmidt rushed to execute their plans as he hoped to prove his theory that European eels migrate to the Sargasso Sea to spawn before other researchers could beat him to it. As a result, the large expedition was divided into two, the first being one that could be conducted quickly and with minimal set-up.

In autumn 1920 Schmidt and Dreschel came into conflict when Dreschel indicated a desire to invite member countries of the International Council for the Exploration of the Sea to join the second expedition. Schmidt sought to keep the effort limited to Denmark and threatened to abandon the effort if it wasn't. Nothing came of the plans.

=== First and second ===
The expedition began in early 1920 in England, and the first Dana left the nation in 17 March for Gibraltar. Schmidt joined the boat in Madeira and it had arrived in the Canary Islands by April. They left there on 11 April and arrived in the Sargasso Sea within seven days. Shortly thereafter, the crew began fishing large amounts of European eel larvae, searching for their breeding grounds. Before they could, the ship began to leak and was forced to travel to Charlotte Amalie, St. Thomas, for repairs. As a result of the failure, the East Asiatic Company agreed to give Schmidt another three months with the ship. They waited on St. Thomas for a month and returned to the Sargasso Sea in June. By then, however, the ship had missed the season where eel eggs were hatching. They caught 6,069 larvae of European eels, and 1,027 of American eel before the first expedition ended on July 4 in the Bermuda Islands. Dana was shortly returned to the East Asiatic Company in Charleston, South Carolina, and the group returned to Denmark. They still retained a majority of funds that had been raised but had not gotten definitive evidence to support the claim that European eels spawned in the Sargasso Sea. A second expedition left on August 30, 1921, with a similar aim.

=== Third ===
Schmidt's third expedition earned him a reputation "as a first rate marine scientist." In autumn 1920 the Danish government purchased a new research ship for marine research in Great Britain. It was transported to Denmark, overhauled, and renamed R/V Dana or Dana II. The boat had 10 kilometres (6.2 mi) of metal wire, allowing it to "fish deeper than anyone before." The expedition began in late 1921, arriving near Portugal and Spain in September, where they investigated the strait of Gibraltar. Over the course of ten months, the expedition did work. In early December, the Carlsberg Foundation agreed to fund an extension of the expedition to travel through the Panama Canal, which it did on 10 January.

In the Pacific, Dana II took numerous samples that revealed the Pacific Ocean was cooler and less salty than the Atlantic. They also found an oxygen minimum zone around 500 metres (1,600 ft) below the surface, making those aboard Dana II the first researchers to document such a phenomenon. High plankton densities helped the expedition observe upwelling and deep-level samples gave them an image of species richness greater than that in the Atlantic. On 20 January, they left the Pacific and, after stopping in Lake Gatun—where they found large amounts of desmid algae, they returned to Europe from Bermuda on 30 May.

=== Aftermath ===
From 1922 to 1923 Schmidt published his theory about the breeding of the eels, and his expedition found growing fame in magazines, pottery, and various awards. The expedition had discovered numerous new species, captured valuable live specimens, and made several important discoveries. A reenactment was filmed in October 1922.

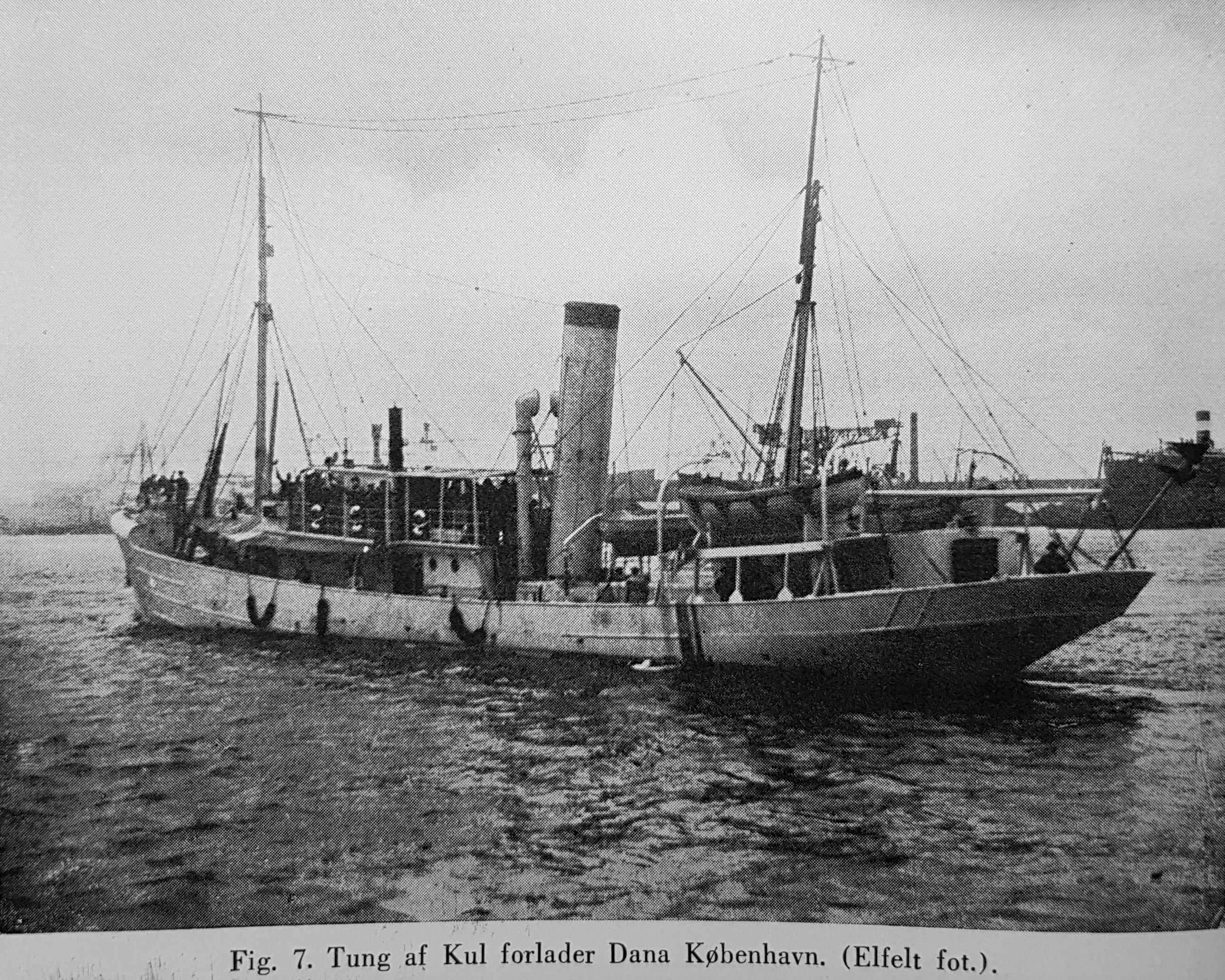
Dana II

== Fourth expedition (1928–1930) ==
Schmidt embarked on his fourth Dana expedition in June 1928 and returned in June 1930. Its official title was "The Carlsberg Foundation's Oceanographical Expedition round the World 1928-30 under the Leadership of Professor Johannes Schmidt" and was Schmidt's largest expedition. The ship traveled over 65,000 nautical miles (120,000 km) from Europe to the Indo-Pacific. It was aimed in part at investigating the oxygen minimum zone that had been discovered in 1920 and also at investigating freshwater eels in the Indian Ocean. They found larva of a "true" freshwater eel in the Pacific and numerous other samples. Schmidt also used the expedition to confirm his earlier research. Nature wrote that "From North Iceland and the Davis Straits southwards to Brazil, and from the Baltic and Black Sea in the east to the United States and Panama in the west, Prof. Schmidt and his collaborators have studied methodically the physical, chemical, and biological conditions of the waters from surface to bottom."

The expedition also found a giant larva that they believed belonged to the eel genus. Based on the size and growth rate of the common eel, they estimated this larva would grow to be 30 metres (98 ft) long. Eleven years later Anton Frederik Bruun, who had helped lead the expedition, said "I believe in the sea serpent" and lectured on its possible existence.

== Bibliography ==
- Poulsen, Bo (2016-08-15). Global Marine Science and Carlsberg - The Golden Connections of Johannes Schmidt (1877-1933). BRILL. ISBN 978-90-04-31639-3.
- Wüst, Georg (1964-01-01). "The major deep-sea expeditions and research vessels 1873–1960: A contribution to the history of oceanography". Progress in Oceanography. 2: 1–52. Bibcode:1964PrOce...2....1W. doi:10.1016/0079-6611(64)90002-3. ISSN 0079-6611.
