= Thor (1930) =

Danish hydrographical research vessel

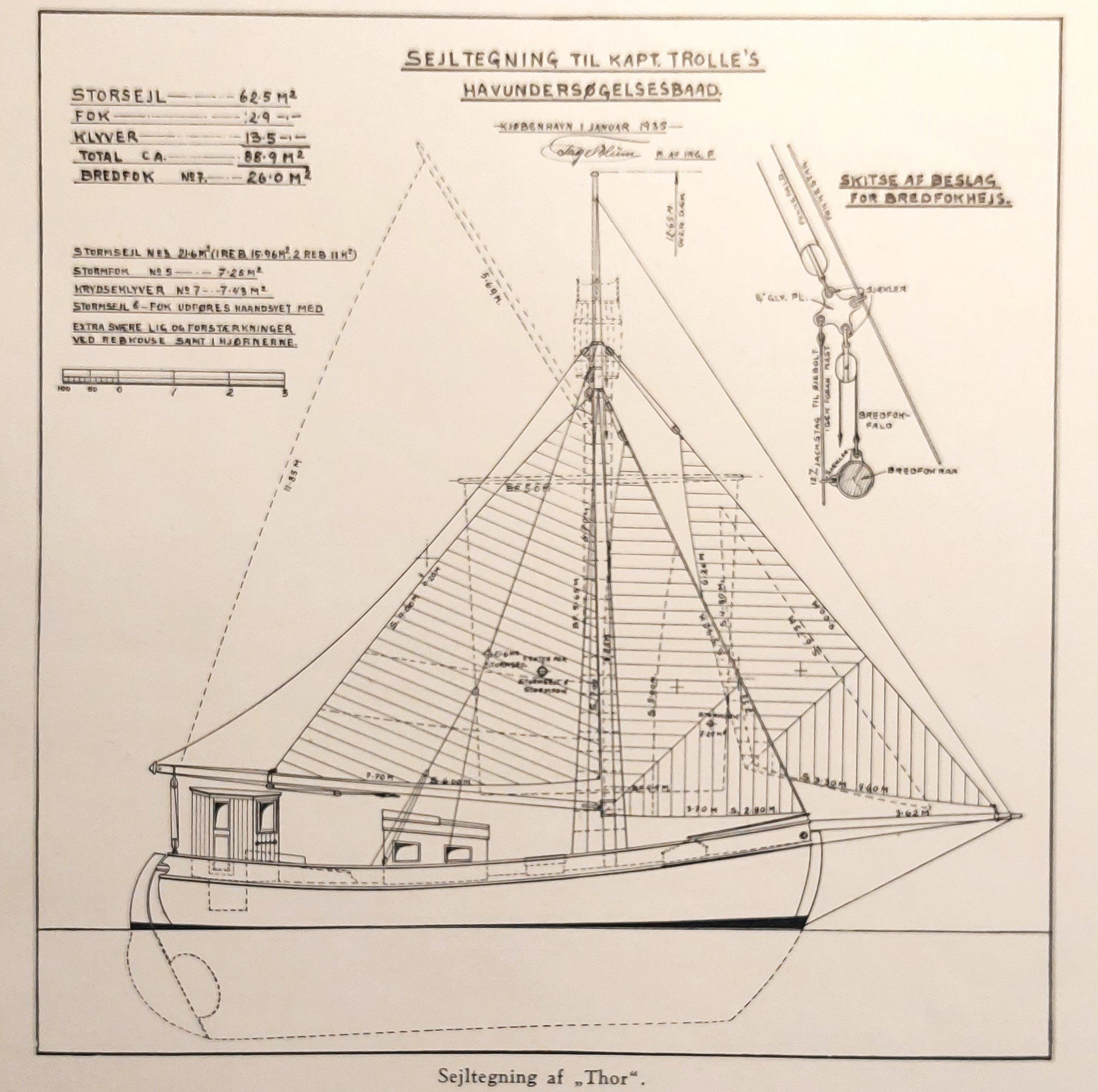
- Sailplan of Thor after refitting for Arctic voyages, 1933

History

Sweden
- Name: Albertina
- Owner: fil. dr. Lars Gunnar Sjöstedt, Lund, Sweden
- Builder: Gustafsson & sons Shipyard, Landskrona, Sweden
- Yard number: 25
- Laid down: 1930
- Home port: Barsebäck, Sweden

Denmark
- Name: Thor
- Owner: Alf Trolle
- Builder: Andersen, Frederikssund, Denmark
- Renamed: 1934
- Home port: Copenhagen
- Identification: OXOH
- Fate: Unknown after 1936

General characteristics
- Class & type: 1-masted, oak on oak
- Tons burthen: 18.4
- Length: 12.25 m (40.2 ft)
- Beam: 4.5 m (15 ft)
- Draught: 2 m (6.6 ft)
- Propulsion: 30 Hp Bolinder Diesel engine
- Sail plan: Gaff-rigged
- Notes: Substantial rebuild in 1933

Thor was a hydrographical research vessel built in 1930 for Swedish biologist fil. dr L. Gunnar Sjösted (1892–1975), teaching college, Kristianstad, Sweden for use in marine biological studies in the Sound/Øresund.

Sold in 1933 to the Danish Captain Alf Trolle and refitted for use in polar waters. The refitting was substantial and included installation of a new engine (30 Hp Bolinder hot bulb engine), electric generators (12/18V, 50A, and 110V, 2 kW; Titan, Copenhagen), electric winches for anchor and a 4000 m hydrographical wire (3.5 mm steel wire), radio (short wave radiotelegraph and MF radiotelephone), echosounder (Echometer, The International Marine Sounding Device, Bruxelles).

Thor was used for two hydrographical expeditions to East Greenland in 1934 and 1935, paid for by the "Alf Trolle and wife's fund in the memory of the Danmark-expedition 1906-1908". The first expedition was led by Trolle himself, the second by Poul Gjessing.

The fate of the ship after returning from the second expedition is unknown.
