= RV Aurora =

Danish research vessel

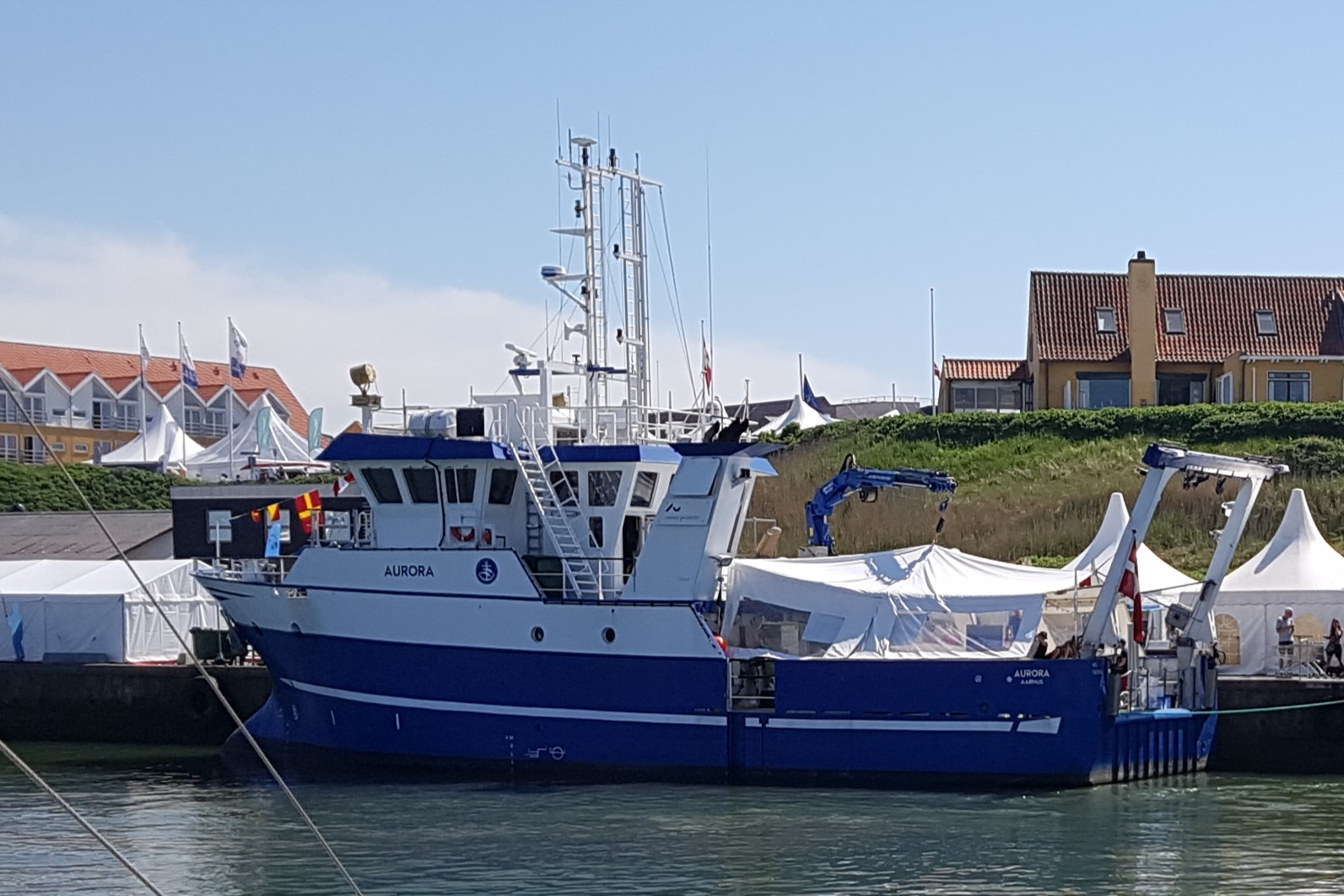
- Aurora in Hirtshals harbour 2018

History

Denmark
- Name: Aurora
- Owner: Aarhus University
- Builder: A/S Hvide Sande Skibs- og Baadebyggeri
- Cost: 40 mill DKK
- Yard number: 130
- Laid down: Februar 2013
- Launched: 7 August 2013
- Commissioned: 25. April 2014
- Homeport: Aarhus
- Identification: Call sign: OUYF; IMO number: 9681596

General characteristics
- Class & type: Multifunctional research vessel
- Tonnage: 310 tons
- Length: 28 m (91 ft 10 in)
- Beam: 8.5 m (27 ft 11 in)
- Draught: 2.75 m (9 ft 0 in)
- Installed power: 2 x Scania DI13 H71M, 368 kW; SISU 60 kW generator
- Propulsion: 2 propellers, bowtruster
- Speed: 11 knots (20 km/h; 13 mph)
- Capacity: 12 passengers
- Sensors & processing systems: Reson Seabat 7125 multibeam echosounder; Innomar SES2000 Sub-bottom profiler
- Notes: A-frame, CTD-winch

RV Aurora is a Danish research vessel, owned and operated by Aarhus University. The ship is named after Aurora, Roman goddess of the dawn. It is rigged as a multi-purpose vessel, with a large working deck and gantry for deployment and recovery of trawl and heavy equipment over the stern. Aurora is classified to sail in the Baltic and the North Sea, east of 3° east and south of 62° north, with an endurance of up to ten days at sea.

Aurora's hull was welded in Stettin, Poland, and towed to Hvide Sande Skibs- og Bådebyggeri in Hvide Sande in August 2013, where the ship was completed as yard no 130. The ship was delivered to Aarhus University on 25 March 2014 and christened on the 25 April by the Danish Minister for the Environment Kirsten Brosbøl.

Aurora is the fourth research vessel of Aarhus University and replaced the much smaller ship Tyra.

== Equipment and use ==
Aurora is designed as a multi-purpose research vessel, with activities centered on the aft working deck, which is large enough to contain two TEU containers. The containers can contain technical equipment; for example a seismic air gun array or a specialized laboratory in addition to the laboratory on board. Alternatively a trawl winch can be mounted on the deck. Trawl and heavy equipment such as pistoncore samplers can be deployed and recovered by means of the gantry. In addition to the open working deck a sheltered deck with doors to the starboard side allows deployment and recovery of water samplers and CTDs.

Propulsion is delivered by two propellers, each driven by a 368 kW Scania DI13 diesel engine and equipped with a 150 kW bow thruster, which can be used for dynamic positioning. Top speed is 11 knots (20 km/h; 13 mph).

The ship contains three decks. The main deck contains galley and stores in the stern, followed by combined mess, lounge and meeting room and a dry laboratory. Adjacent to the dry lab is the sheltered wet lab, which continues into the open aft deck. Below the main deck is the engine room aft and cabins for the crew (two single rooms for captain and chief mate, two double rooms for deck crew and cook) and scientific crew and students (two double rooms and one four-bunk room). Above the main deck is the bridge deck, separated into the bridge itself, sitting on top of a semi-deck containing ship electronics, and a lower part facing the aft deck and used for computers and other equipment during collection of data from multibeam sonar, seismic streamers and other towed equipment. On top of the bridge is a platform designed for visual surveys for birds and marine mammals.

The ship is designed for day cruises with a crew of two. For longer cruises the crew is four plus a cook. Endurance is 10 days at sea and the service area is the Baltic Sea and the North Sea east of 3° East and south of 62° Nord.
