= Dana (1921 ship) =

Danish research ship

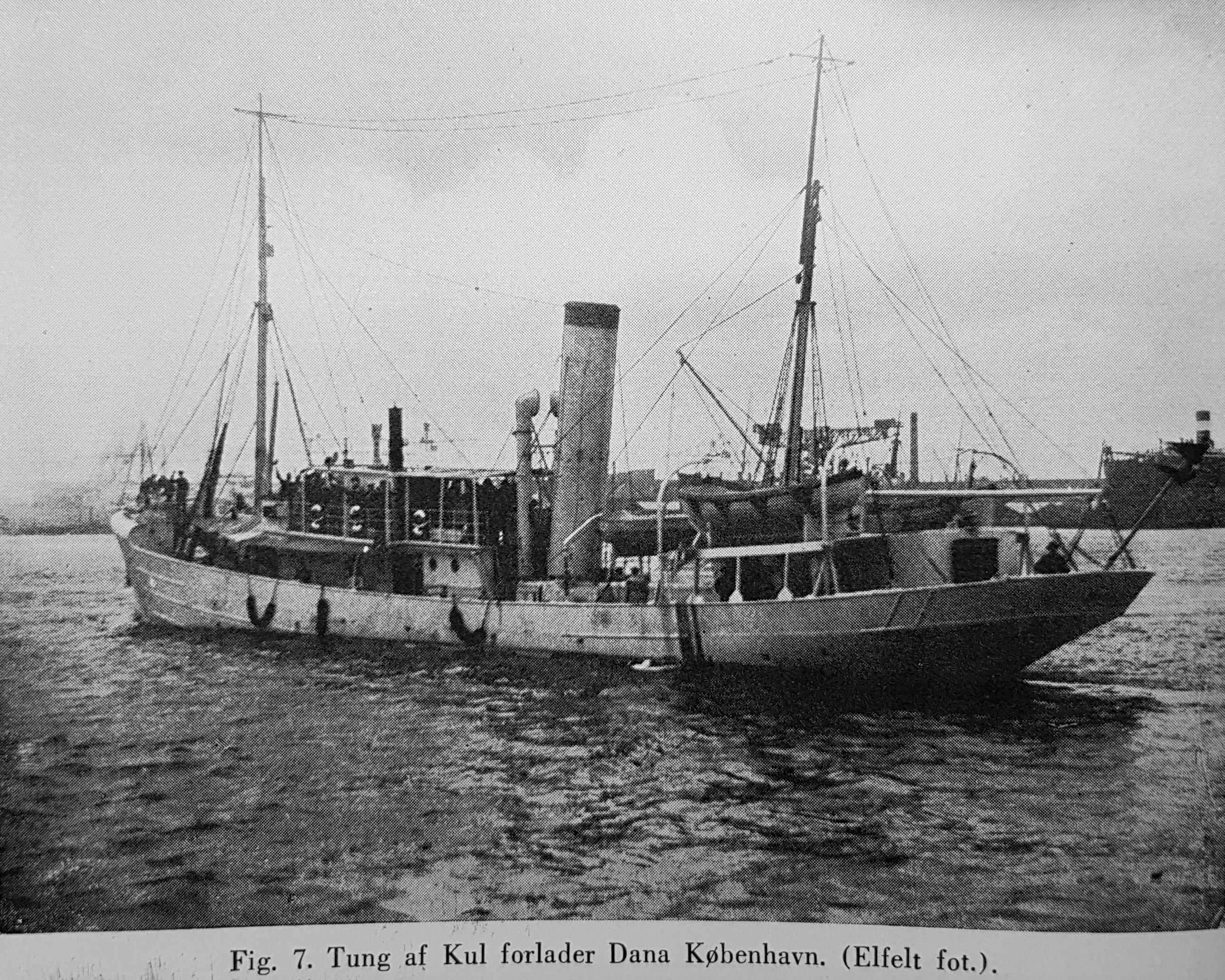
- Dana leaving Copenhagen 1928 for circumnavigation of the world

History

United Kingdom
- Name: HMT John Quilliam
- Owner: British Admiralty
- Builder: Cochrane & Sons, Selby
- Yard number: 801
- Launched: 12 March 1917
- Completed: 30 August 1917
- Out of service: 1921
- Identification: Call sign: NCWR
- Notes: Armed with QF 12-pounder 12 cwt naval gun

Denmark
- Name: Dana II
- Owner: Danish Ministry of Fisheries
- Port of registry: Copenhagen
- In service: 1921
- Out of service: 1935
- Identification: Call sign: OXQC
- Fate: Sunk in collision

General characteristics
- Class & type: converted Mersey-class trawler
- Tonnage: 354 GRT; 163 NRT
- Length: 138.2 ft (42.1 m)
- Beam: 23.7 ft (7.2 m)
- Draught: 12.8 ft (3.9 m)
- Decks: 1
- Propulsion: 500 hp (370 kW) triple expansion steam engine, Richardsons, Westgarth & Co.
- Speed: 11 knots (20 km/h; 13 mph)
- Crew: 18

Dana was a Danish research vessel, best known for the circumnavigation of the world in the third Dana expedition of 1928–1930. The trawler sank in 1935 after a fishing vessel collided with it in fog.

== Construction and design ==
The ship was built as an Admiralty Mersey-class trawler in 1917 (HMT John Quilliam) for military service.

== Danish service ==
In 1921, John Quilliam was sold to the Danish Government. She was subsequently rigged as a deep-sea research fishing trawler. She was renamed Dana II, to avoid confusion with the motor schooner Dana, which had served on the first and second Dana expeditions. Dana II replaced the previous Danish research vessel Thor, served until 1935 and was herself succeeded by Dana III, built in 1937.

== Collision and loss ==
Dana sank on 22 June 1935 in the North Sea following a collision with the German fishing trawler Pickhuben, of Cuxhaven, about 70 kilometres (43 mi) west of Ringkøbing. The collision happened in dense fog at 6:07 AM when Pickhuben rammed Dana with great force about amidships. None of the 22 persons onboard Dana were injured in the collision and all managed to escape to Pickhuben. The ship sank ten minutes after Captain Hansen left the ship, the last man to do so. All personal belongings and large amounts of scientific material were lost. Dana's captain directed Pickhuben to the nearby lightship at Horns Reef where the following telegram was radioed to the Danish Government:

Dana hit by Trawler Pickhuben in fog at 6 AM this morning, sank immediately, all hands saved onboard the trawler, course towards Esbjerg. Dana lies at approx. 30 metres of water, 55 degrees, 55 minutes northern latitude, approx. 7 degrees eastern longitude. A large buoy with flag was deployed by the trawler at the spot.

At the following inquiry in Esbjerg and later also in Hamburg, full responsibility for the collision was attributed to the navigator on Pickhuben, who had steamed too fast in the dense fog and had failed to react to Dana's warning signals.

The wreck of Dana was found in 2005 on the northern side of Horns Reef on the Danish west coast.
