= Dana (1980 ship) =

Danish research ship

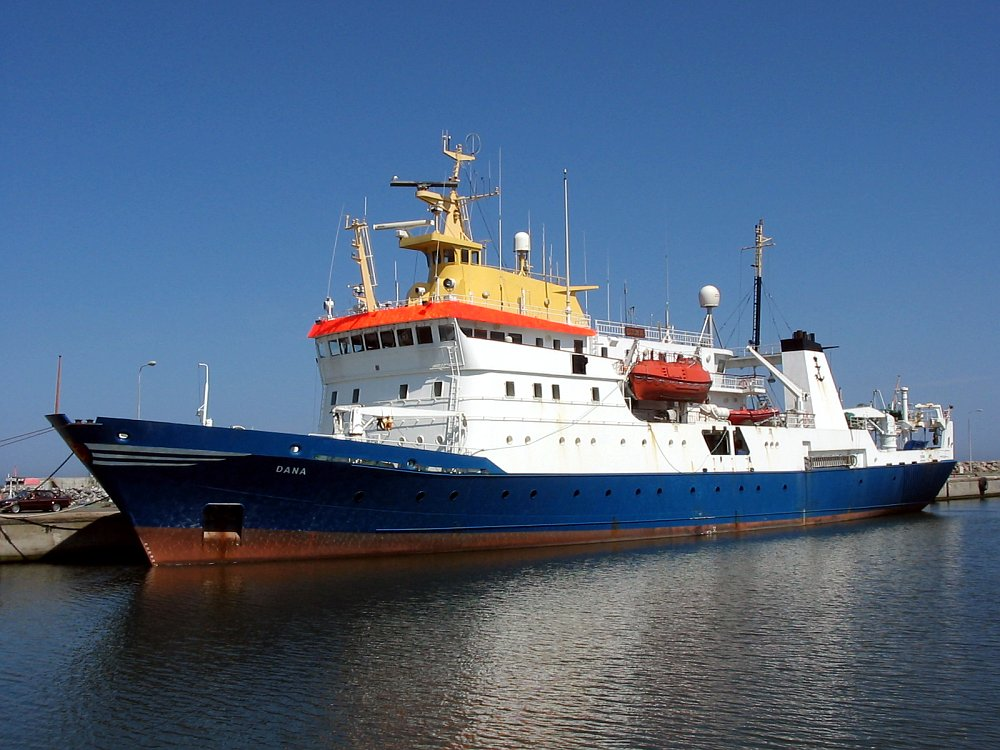
- Dana (IV) in Hirtshals harbour, 2004

History

Denmark
- Name: Dana (IV)
- Owner: Technical University of Denmark
- Port of registry: Hirtshals
- Builder: Aarhus Flydedok, Aarhus, Denmark
- Cost: 107,594,001 DKK
- Launched: 1980-11-28
- Completed: 1981-03-20
- In service: 1981
- Identification: Call sign: OXBH; IMO number: 7912680; MMSI number: 219384000
- Status: Active

General characteristics
- Type: Research vessel (deep sea stern trawler)
- Tonnage: 2,545 BT / 763 NT
- Length: 78.43 m (257 ft 4 in) meter
- Beam: 14.7 m (48 ft 3 in)
- Draught: 5.70 m (18 ft 8 in)
- Ice class: 1A
- Propulsion: 2 × 1,710 kW (2,290 hp) B&W Alpha Diesel type 16V23LU, 3 × 737 kW aux. (Cummins 12 cyl.)
- Speed: 15.5 knots (28.7 km/h; 17.8 mph) (max)
- Range: 14,000 nautical miles (26,000 km; 16,000 mi)
- Endurance: 50 days
- Complement: 38 (12–18 crew, remaining researchers)

Dana (IV) is the primary Danish research vessel. It entered service in 1981, where it replaced the research vessel Dana (III). Originally built for the Danish Fisheries and Marine Research, it was transferred to the National Institute for Aquatic Resources under the Technical University of Denmark in 2007.

The ship is rigged as a deep sea stern trawler and fully equipped with facilities for fisheries and hydrographical research. Primary areas of operation are the Baltic Sea, North Sea and Greenland.

It is expected to remain in active service until replaced by a new research vessel, Dana (V), in 2027 from Construcciones Navales P. Freire, S.A in Spain.
