= Hector Frederik Estrup Jungersen =

Danish marine zoologist

Hector Frederik Estrup Jungersen (13 January 1854 – 6 March 1917) was a Danish marine zoologist born in Dejbjerg (today part of Ringkøbing-Skjern Municipality) .

In 1877 he obtained his degree in zoology, and in 1889 his doctorate of sciences. From 1879 he taught classes at the Metropolitanskolen (Metropolitan School) in Copenhagen, where he served as an assistant professor from 1882 to 1899. During this time period (1886–1901) he was also a lecturer at the nearby Polytekniske Læreanstalt (Poly-technical College). In 1899 he succeeded Christian Frederik Lütken (1827–1901) as professor of zoology and manager of the zoological museum (department of vertebrates) at the University of Copenhagen. In 1912/13 he served as university rector.

Jungersen was a proponent of evolutionary comparative morphology, and is known for making significant contributions in the field of ichthyotomy (fish anatomy). In 1895–96 he participated as a senior zoologist in the "Ingolf Expedition" to waters near Greenland and Iceland, and afterwards carried out taxonomic investigations of marine fauna.

From 1899 to 1917 he was chair of the Danish Natural History Society. He was the author of Volume I (Reptiles and Amphibians, Krybdyr og Padder) of the multi-volume series on Danish fauna, (Danmarks fauna, 1907). From the "Ingolf Expedition" he wrote an article on deep-sea marine life and its zoogeographical distribution. A number of his written works have been published in English.

== Writings ==
- "On the appendices genitales in the Greenland shark, Somniosus microcephalus (Bl. Schn.), and other selachians", 1899
- "Pennatulida", 1904
- "Ichthyotomical contributions", 1908–1910
- "Ichthyotomical contributions. II. The structure of the Aulostomidae, Syngnathidae and Solenostomidae", 1910
- "Chordeuma obesum, a new parasitic Copepod, endoparasitic in asteronyx loveni M. Tr", 1914
- "The Alcyonaria of east-Greenland", 1916
- "Anthomastus", 1927.
