= Dana (1937 ship) =

Danish research ship launched in 1937

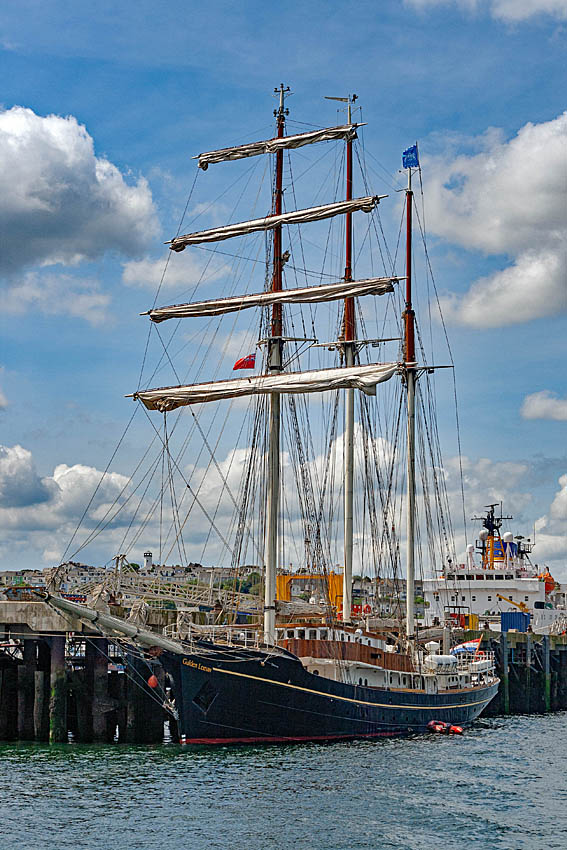
- As Gulden Leeuw at Falmouth

History

Denmark
- Name: Dana (III)
- Owner: Ministry of Agriculture and Fishing
- Port of registry: Copenhagen
- Builder: Frederikshavn Shipyard, Frederikshavn, Denmark
- Cost: 952,500 DKK
- Yard number: 207
- Laid down: 6 October 1936
- Launched: 1 September 1937
- Completed: 21 December 1937
- In service: 1938
- Identification: Call sign: OYTJ; IMO number: 5085897

Denmark
- Name: Dana Researcher
- Owner: Svend E. Sønderstrup
- Port of registry: Fåborg
- Acquired: 1980
- Identification: Call sign: OYTJ; IMO number: 5085897

Denmark
- Name: Esvagt Dana
- Owner: Esvagt
- Port of registry: Esbjerg
- Acquired: 1984
- Identification: Call sign: OYTJ2; IMO number: 5085897

Denmark
- Name: Dana Nyborg
- Owner: Thomas Brocklebank, Grindsted
- Port of registry: Esbjerg
- Acquired: 2001
- Identification: Call sign: OYTJ2; IMO number: 5085897

Netherlands
- Name: Gulden Leeuw
- Owner: P&T Charters
- Acquired: 2007
- Identification: Call sign: PCBH; IMO number: 5085897; MMSI number: 246709000
- Status: Active

General characteristics
- Tonnage: 354 GRT / 163 NRT
- Length: 150.6 feet (1939)
- Beam: 28 feet
- Draught: 16,4 feet
- Decks: 1
- Propulsion: 1100 hp 6-cyl. 4SA Frichs Diesel. Replaced in 1970 with 1200 hp 10-cyl. 4SA B&W Alpha-Diesel
- Notes: Extended by 8 m in 1939. Rigged as 3-masted schooner in 2007

Dana was the primary Danish research vessel for almost 40 years. It was built in 1937 and served research purposes until 1980. On the first cruise into the North Atlantic in 1938 it was discovered that the ship was unsuited for its purpose, as it was not sufficiently stable to allow scientific work. It was returned to the shipyard and extended by 8 metres (26 ft) in 1939. During the Second World War (1940-1945) the ship was kept and maintained in Copenhagen harbour, but with vital engine parts removed and thus never seized by the German occupation force.

The main work from Dana was to conduct marine biological and hydrographical research in the Baltic, North Sea and waters around Faroe Islands and Greenland. In 1966 Dana was on a cruise to the Sargasso Sea and West Indies (cruise leader Erik Berthelsen), with primary aims to conduct hydrographical research and continue research on the reproductive biology of the European eel.

Dana was succeeded by the research vessel Dana (IV) in 1980. The ship served for a period as guard and crew exchange vessel for oil and gas installations in the North Sea and was eventually sold to P&T Charters. It was completely refurbished, rigged as a 3-masted schooner under the name of Gulden Leeuw and continues to sail as a charter vessel.
