= Finn Salomonsen =

Danish ornithologist

Finn Salomonsen (31 January 1909 – 23 April 1983) was a Danish ornithologist. He is best known for his work on the birds of Greenland.

His interest in Greenland began at the age of 16 when he made a trip with Lehn Schioler to the Upernavik District. He obtained a degree in zoology in 1932 and joined as a zoological assistant in the Danish Nature Reserves. He worked on migration of birds and moulting patterns extensively. During World War II he fled to Sweden with his family to escape persecution due to his Jewish ancestry.

Salomonsen's work included over scientific publications, and authorship or co-authorship of 19 books. Apart from research in the Greenland and Arctic region, he went on expeditions to the Philippines (1951–1952) and to the Bismarck Archipelago, New Guinea (Noona Dan expedition, 1962). He was editor of the Dansk Ornithologisk Forenings Tidsskrift from 1942 to 1961.

Finn Salomonsen was father of the Danish rock-singer Sanne Salomonsen (born 1955).

== Works ==
- "The Arctic Year", G.P. Putnam's Sons, New York, Copyright 1958. (Peter Freuchen and Finn Salomonsen)
