= Proavis =

Hypothetical extinct taxon

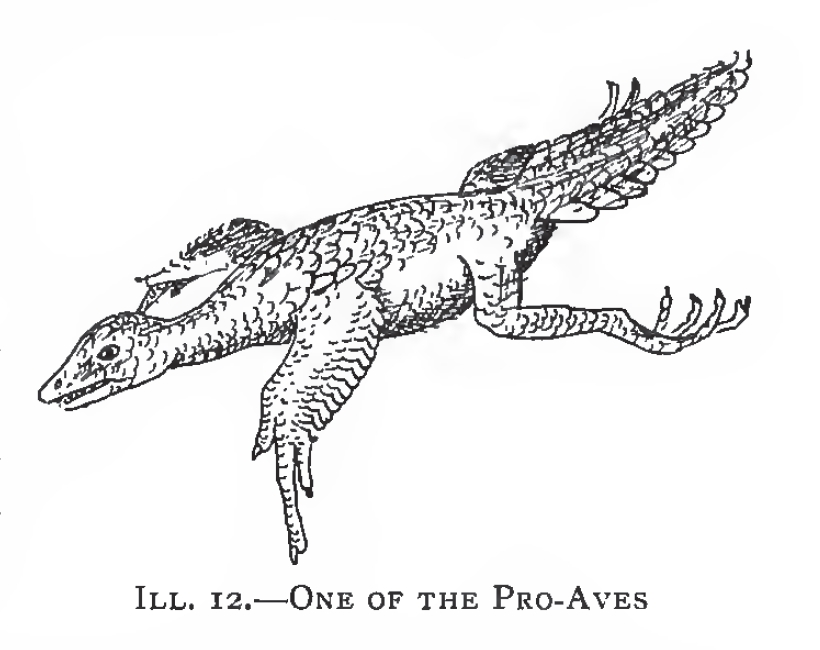
Hypothetical restoration of "one of the Pro-Aves", as shown at the British Museum by William Plane Pycraft in 1906 (here extracted from Pycraft 1910 book A History of Birds).

Proavis is a hypothetical extinct species or hypothetical extinct taxon. The term was coined in the early 20th century in an attempt to support and explain the hypothetical evolutionary steps and anatomical adaptations leading from non-avian theropod dinosaurs to birds. The term has also been used by defenders of the thecodontian origin of birds.

== History ==
The term "Proavis" was first coined, although under the form "Pro-Aves", by English osteologist and zoologist William Plane Pycraft in "The Origin of Birds", a 1906 article published in the magazine Knowledge and Scientific News. Pycraft added to his article his own drawn depiction of the hypothetical animal, a restoration entitled "One of the Pro-Aves". Pycraft's "Pro-Avis" (singular of "Pro-Aves") was arboreal, as suggested Professor Osborn six years before, in 1900, in an article dealing with the hypothetical common ancestors of dinosaurs and birds. Pycraft assumed that birds had developed as tree-dwelling dinosaurs, gliding on membranes between the limbs and the trunk. These membranes would gradually have been covered by increasingly more elongated scales, which eventually would have evolved into feathers.

A year after Pycraft's article, the Hungarian aristocrat and paleontologist Franz Nopcsa, who, while residing at London, had seen Pycraft's restoration, drew his own vision of the animal, a picture and article published in a 1907 issue of the Proceedings of the Zoological Society of London (an English science publication nowadays known as Journal of Zoology). But this time, for his own "Pro-Avis" restoration, Nopcsa suggested a cursorial origin, not arboreal. The "Pro-Avis" would thus have been a running animal, accelerating and prolonging its jumps by flapping with feathered forelimbs. There is a model of Nopcsa's restoration, still preserved, and recently restored, in the Grant Museum of Zoology, the only remaining university zoological museum in London.

When Pycraft published his book A History of Birds, in 1910, he reinserted his 1906 restoration One of the Pro-Aves (in page 39). In the following years, as of 1913, Danish artist and amateur zoologist Gerhard Heilmann also used and popularised the term Proavis, this time presenting the public with more accurate and anatomically probable drawings. Heilmann favoured a scientific model in which the assumed Proavis was arboreal and of thecodontian descent, thus not a dinosaur.

In 1961, Czech paleontologist Josef Augusta included "Proavis" in his book Prehistoric Birds and Reptiles. The animal illustration, as were all illustrations in the book, was painted by Zdeněk Burian.

During the 1970s the work of John Ostrom, breathing new life into the hypothesis that birds were dinosaurs, revived the interest in the direct ancestors of birds. Ostrom assumed these were cursorial. An illustration of a running dinosaur explicitly indicated as a "Proavis" was in 1976 published by Dieter Stefan Peters.

In 1991 and 1996 "proavis" or "protoavis" models were proposed by respectively Samuel Tarsitano and Alan Feduccia, both adherents of the "thecodont" hypothesis about the origins of birds. These "proaves" were supposed to be arboreal, with short necks, long trunks, sprawling legs, non-elongated hindlimbs, small hands and feet, small general size, and gliding on membranes. Feduccia's "protoavis" had membranes on the forelimbs only and was fashioned on the model of Megalancosaurus.

The term Proavis was used again in 1999, when Joseph Garner, Graham Taylor, and Adrian Thomas proposed their "pouncing proavis model", an hypothesis entailing that the origin of avian flight rested in a predatory behaviour, the "proavis" jumping on its prey from trees (see pouncing proavis model in Origin of avian flight).

In his 2002 book Dinosaurs of the Air, Gregory S. Paul tried to conceptually model a "pro-avian". In his view the direct ancestors of birds cannot have been completely arboreal, because in that case they would probably have used membranes to fly. He thought they must have represented an intermediate ecological stage, in which the hindlimbs still had largely cursorial adaptations whereas the arms had been elongated in order to climb. Feathers, originally serving the insulation of an already warm-blooded animal, would by elongation have turned the arms into wings in order to fly. More generally, the proavians would, in view of their basal theropod forebears and bird descendants, have been typified by long necks, a short trunk, long fingers with opposable digits, a decoupling of the locomotor functions of the forelimbs and hindlimbs, a lack of a propatagium, a shallow tail, and a weight of about one kilogramme. Paul illustrated his analysis with a skeletal diagram, accompanied by a life illustration of a "proavis". When in 2013 Aurornis was described, at the time the most basal known member of the Avialae, the group consisting of birds and their closest relatives, the Italian paleontologist Andrea Cau remarked it bore an uncanny resemblance to Paul's "proavis".

== Gallery ==
Some hypothetical early bird stages

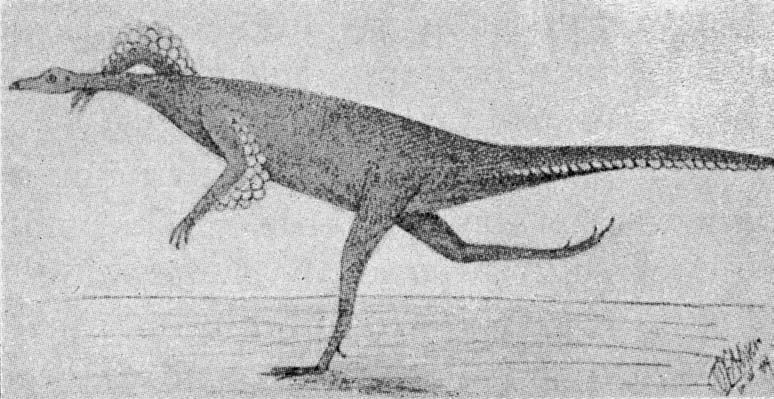
Illustration of "a running Pro-Avis" as envisioned by Franz Nopcsa in 1907 after having seen the Pycraft restoration "One of the Pro-Aves".

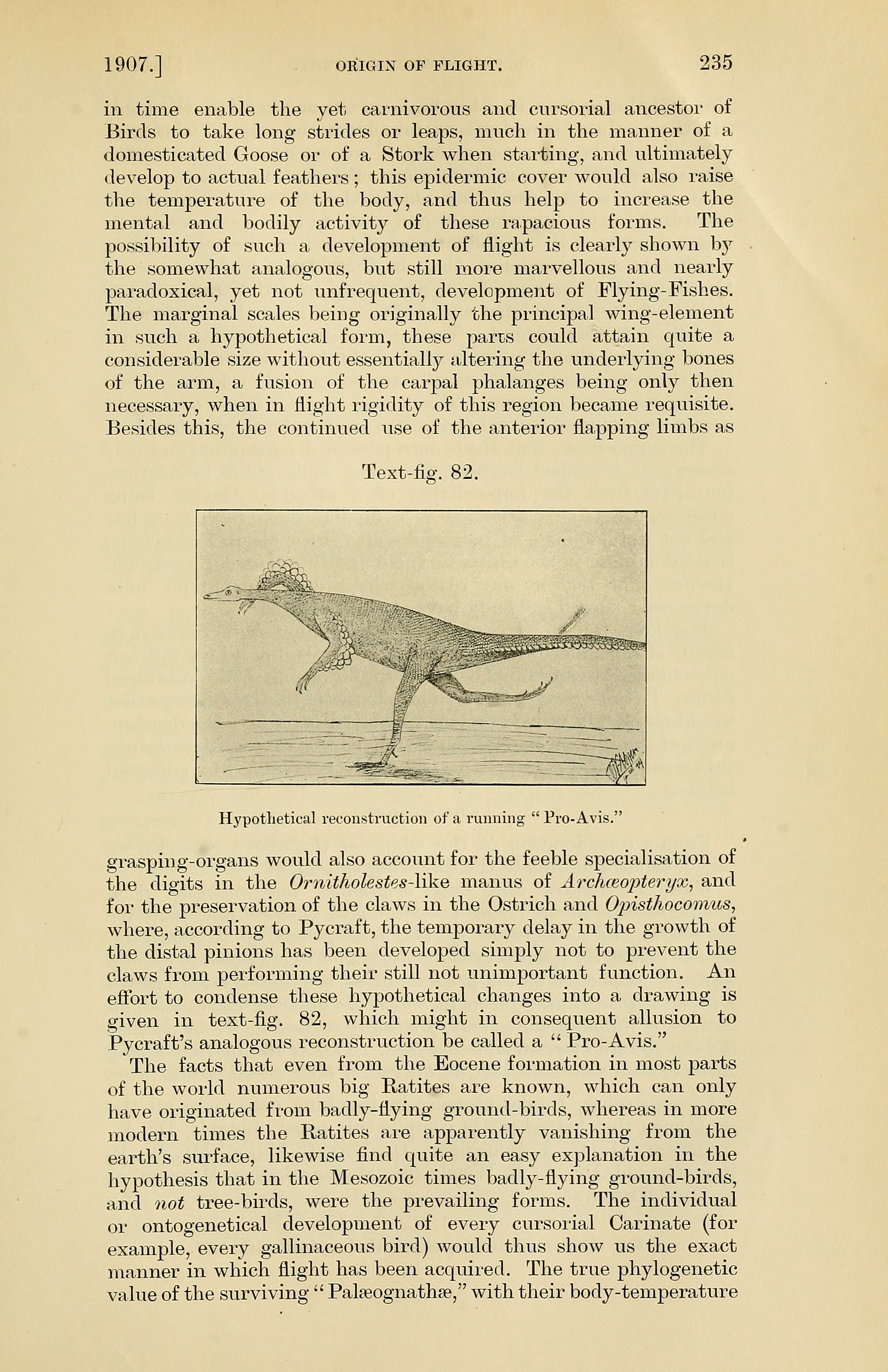
Nopcsa's illustration on its original publication (Proceedings of the Zoological Society of London, 1907).

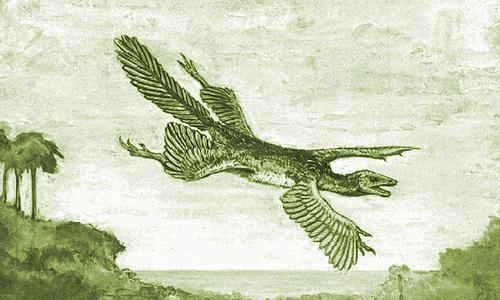
A hypothetical "Tetrapteryx", as imagined by William Beebe (1915).

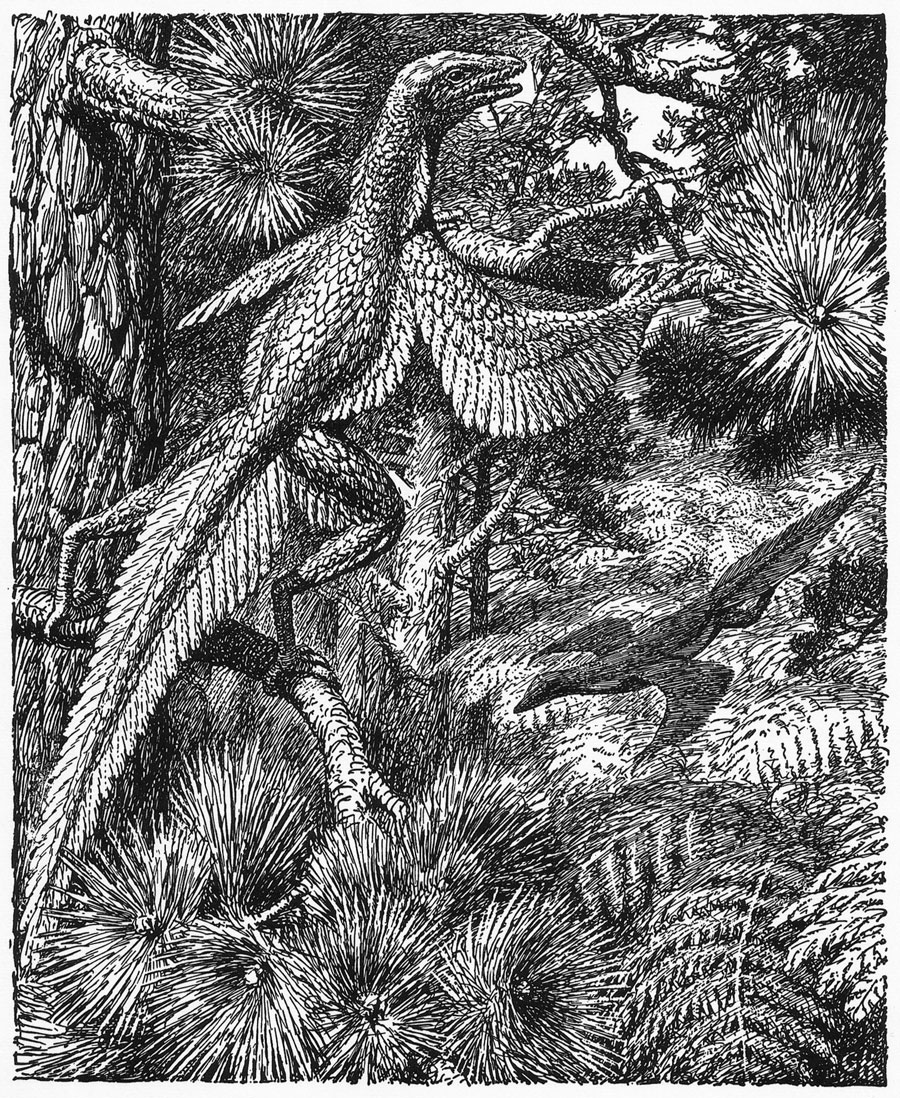
Gerhard Heilmann's arboreal vision of Proavis (1916).

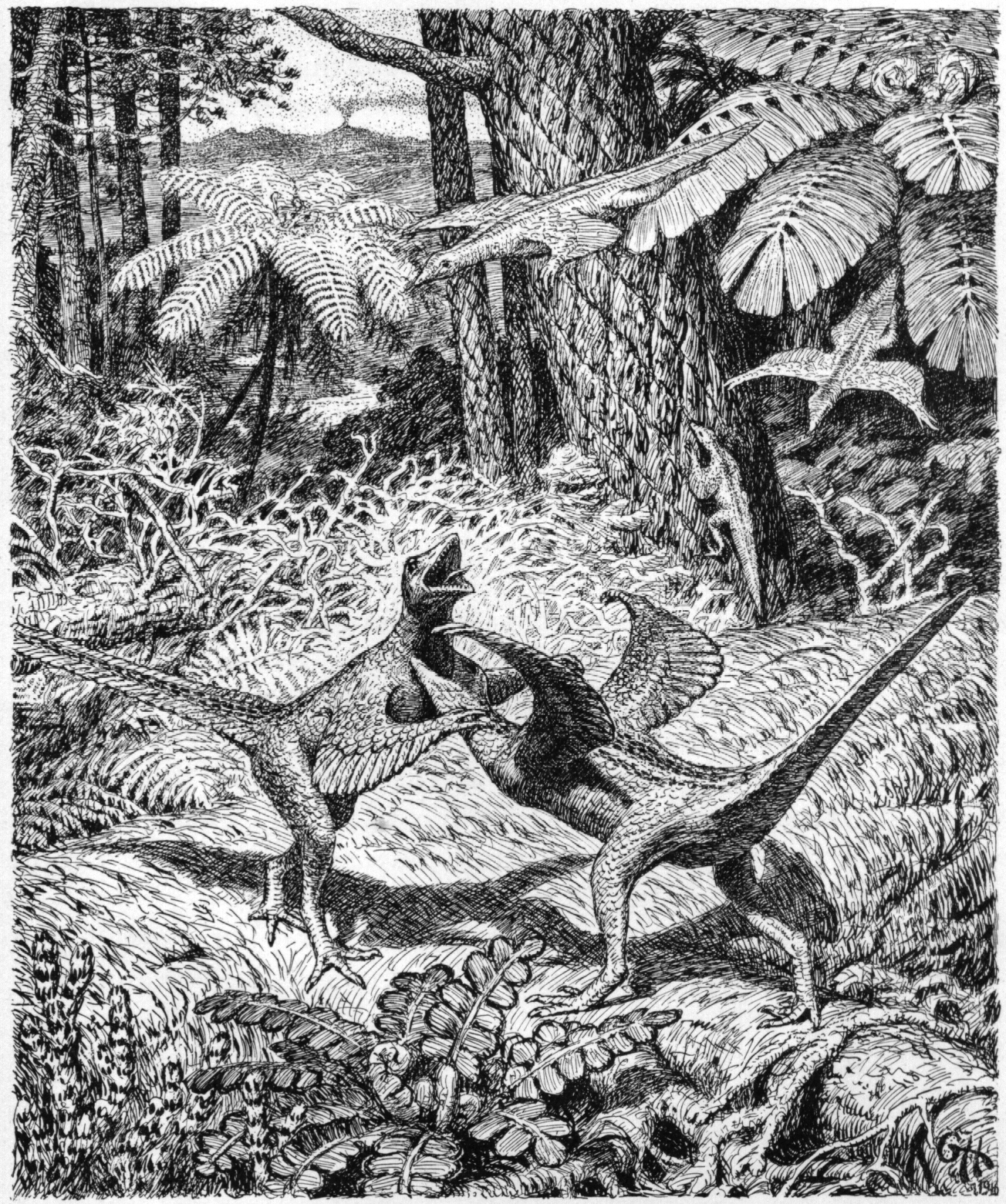
Heilmann's hypothetical illustration of a pair of fighting 'Proaves' (1916).

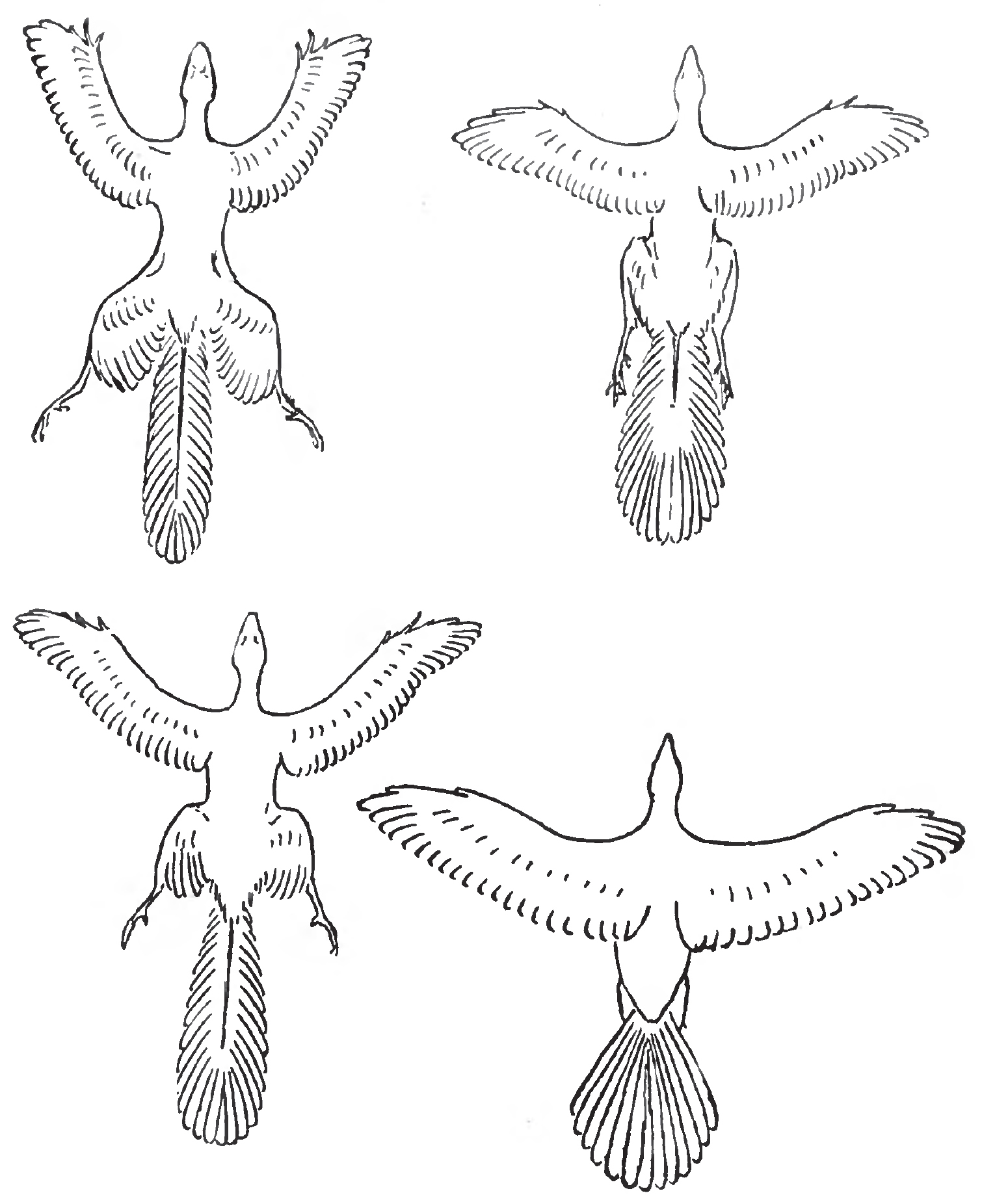
Beebe's comparison of Tetrapteryx, Archaeopteryx, a hypothetical stage and a modern bird (1922).

== See also ==
- Origin of birds
- Origin of avian flight
- The Origin of Birds (book)
