= The Origin of Birds =

Book by Gerhard Heilmann

- Cover illustration of the 1972 Dover reprint edition of The Origin of Birds, based on a painting by Gerhard Heilmann
- Author: Gerhard Heilmann
- Language: English
- Subject: Ornithology; Evolutionary biology Paleontology
- Genre: science, biology
- Publisher: England: H. F. & G. Witherby; U.S.: D. Appleton & Company
- Publication date: 1926
- Publication place: England, United States
- Media type: Print (hardback)
- Pages: 209
- ISBN: 0-486-22784-7
- Followed by: Univers og traditionen (1940)

The Origin of Birds is an early synopsis of bird evolution written in 1926 by Gerhard Heilmann, a Danish artist and amateur zoologist. The book was born from a series of articles published between 1913 and 1916 in Danish, and although republished as a book it received mainly criticism from established scientists and got little attention within Denmark. The English edition of 1926, however, became highly influential at the time due to the breadth of evidence synthesized as well as the artwork used to support its arguments. It was considered the last word on the subject of bird evolution for several decades after its publication.

Through the course of the research represented in the book, Heilmann considers and eventually rejects the possibility of all living and several extinct groups of reptiles as potential ancestors for modern birds, including crocodilians, pterosaurs and several groups of dinosaurs. Despite his acknowledgment that some of the smaller Jurassic theropods had many similarities to Archaeopteryx and modern birds, he determined that they were unlikely to be direct bird ancestors and that they were instead closely–related offshoots, and concluded that the similarities were a result of convergent evolution rather than direct ancestry. Based essentially on a process of elimination, Heilmann arrives at the conclusion that birds must be descended from thecodonts, a group of archosaurs that lived during the Permian and Triassic periods. Although this conclusion was later shown to be inaccurate, The Origin of Birds was regarded as a masterful piece of scholarship at the time and set the international agenda for research in bird evolution for nearly half a century, and much of its research remains of interest.

== Background ==
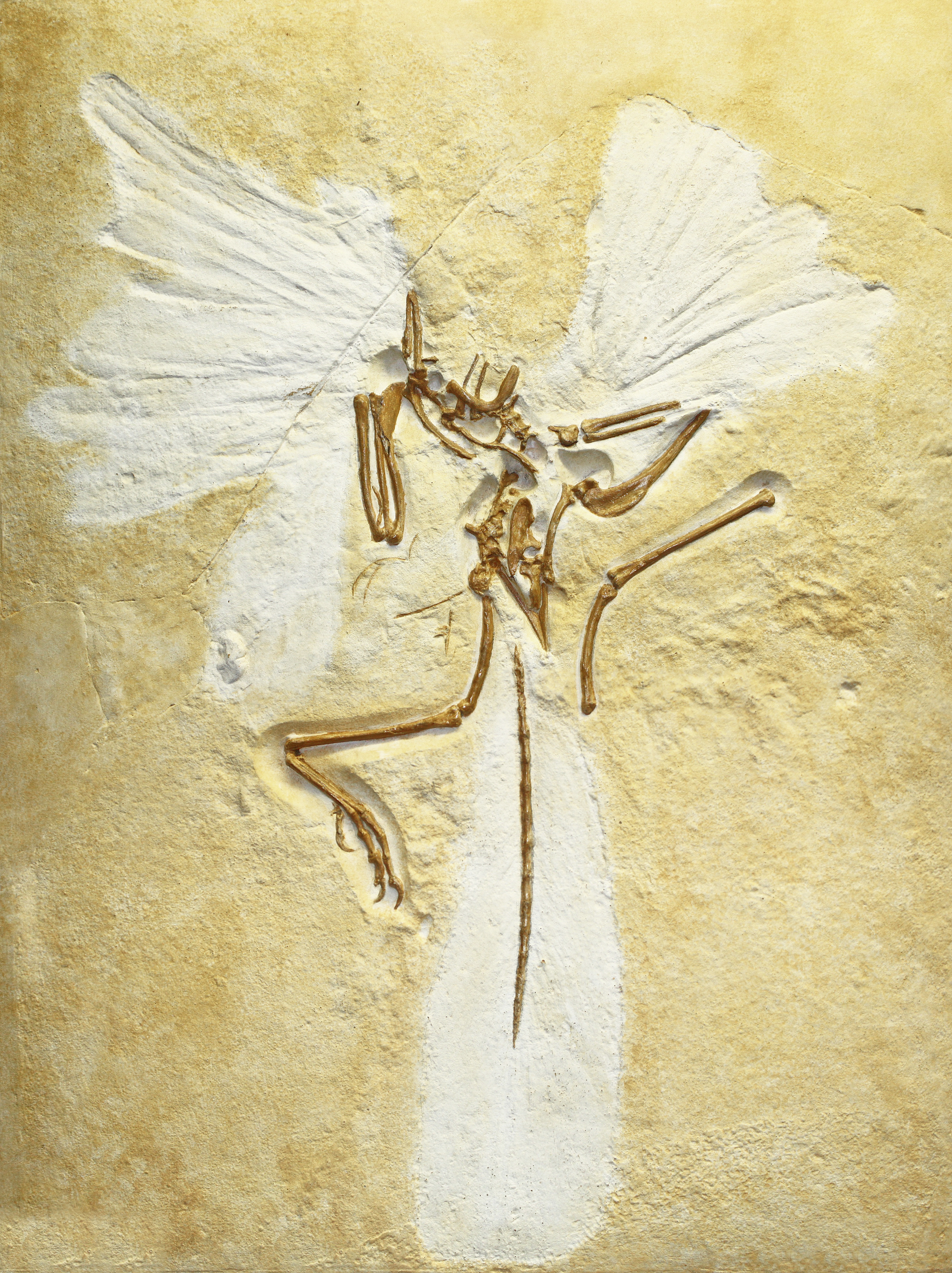
The first Archaeopteryx specimen

When Heilmann began his research in the early 1900s, the early bird Archaeopteryx was only known from three fossils found in the limestone quarries of Solnhofen near Eichstätt, Germany. The three fossils consisted of two nearly complete skeletons found in 1861 and 1877 and a single feather from 1860. They had been discovered just a few decades after the discovery of the dinosaurs, and as some dinosaurs appeared somewhat birdlike, Archaeopteryx was regarded as a possible "missing link" between reptiles and birds by many paleontologists at the time.

The similarities between Archaeopteryx, known dinosaurs and extant birds were examined and emphasized, with Thomas Huxley championing the idea that Archaeopteryx as well as modern birds had more in common with theropod dinosaurs than any other group of animals. This was at the time in opposition to the view of anatomist Sir Richard Owen of the British Museum, who viewed Archaeopteryx as no different taxonomically from modern birds. Huxley's work was controversial, and this climate of uncertainty and contention about bird origins persisted well into the beginning of the 20th century.

While the dinosaur-bird connection (or lack thereof) was being pursued in paleontology, the problem of the evolution of flight was under scrutiny as well. It was observed that a number of animals with moderate flying or gliding ability, such as bats, flying lizards and flying squirrels have arboreal lifestyles. This led to the idea that the ancestors of birds must have gradually acquired the ability to fly from leaping among branches in the tops of trees. The Hungarian paleontologist Franz Nopcsa proposed an alternate hypothesis in 1907, arguing that the ancestors of birds were fast-running, bipedal animals related to theropod dinosaurs. When Heilmann came onto the paleontology scene, these two sets of conflicting theories provided the framework for his research and eventual conclusions.

== Publication ==
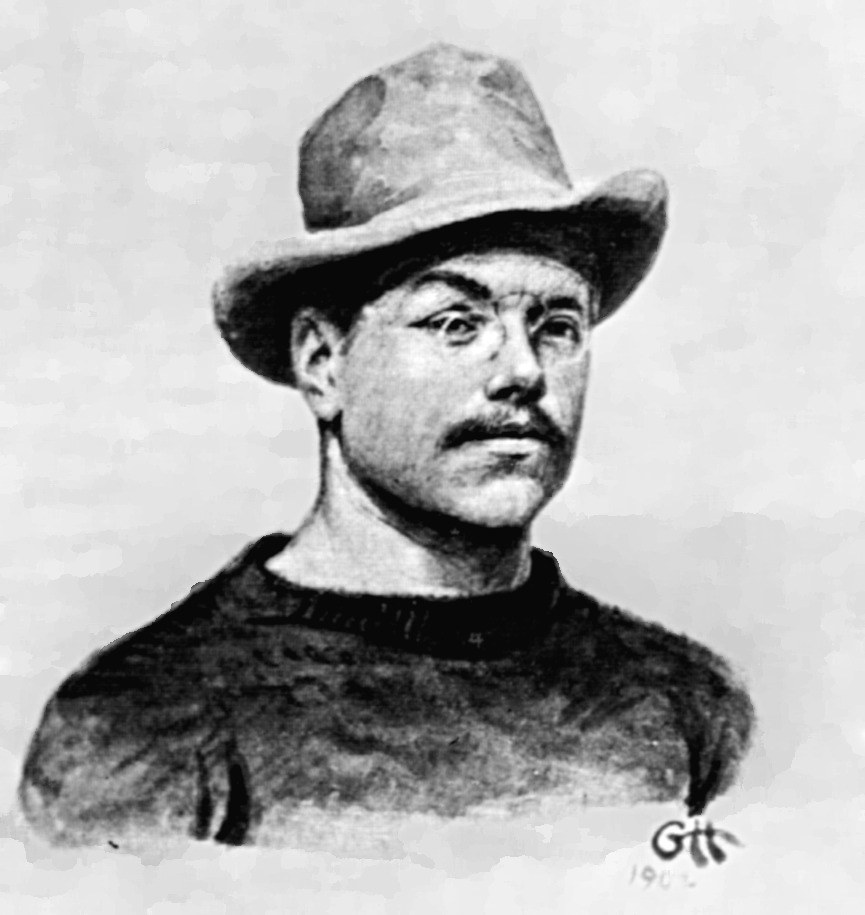
Self–portrait of Gerhard Heilmann from 1912

Between 1913 and 1916, Gerhard Heilmann published a series of articles in the journal of the Danish Ornithological Society, all heavily illustrated and dealing with the question of the origin of birds. He first proposed the idea of a popular treatise on bird evolution in 1912 to Otto Helms, the editor of the journal of the Danish Ornithological Society. Helms supported the idea but recommended that Heilmann first seek professional advice on the topic. Despite the lack of formal training in zoology, Heilmann succeeded in amassing his research with the help of several others, including the expert in prehistoric animals at the Zoological Museum in Copenhagen, Adolf Herluf Winge, and the biologist D'Arcy Wentworth Thompson of the University of Dundee. Winge, though initially showing interest in Heilmann's work, later proved to be a source of frustration by refusing to engage Heilmann in depth on various scientific queries. Heilmann eventually broke off contact, expressing some bitterness at the apparent change of heart, which Heilmann later ascribed to Winge's belief in Lamarckism.

Heilmann's original articles were publicly ignored by Danish zoologists, but caused considerable unrest behind the scenes. Danish zoologist R.H. Stamm, for example, mocked Heilmann in private letters to Helms shortly after the publication of his first article. Other Danish zoologists openly expressed their disdain for Heilmann's work as well, including the professors of zoology in Copenhagen University J.E.V. Boas and Hector Jungersen. Despite this, Helms continued to steadfastly support Heilmann and his ideas, which eventually began to gain attention from abroad. In April 1913, the American expert in fossil birds R. W. Shufeldt came across Heilmann's first article by chance. Shufeldt, who was married to a Norwegian, could understand some Danish and was able to interpret Heilmann's work and initiated contact with him shortly thereafter. This opened up the opportunity for international correspondence with distinguished paleontologists for Heilmann, which was instrumental to the recognition of his work outside of Denmark.

Heilmann's articles were later collected and published as a book in Danish in 1916 with the title as in his series, Vor Nuvaerende Viden om Fuglenes Afstamming ("our present knowledge about the origin of birds"). This met the same lack of interest and is thought to have been a result of publishing in Danish, as this made it inaccessible to many scientists working in the U.S. and much of Europe. The field of paleontology at the time was dominated by American and English scientists, and the discipline in continental Europe was dominated by Germany and to a lesser degree France.

Consequently, and at the urging of Shufeldt, Heilmann devoted much of the next few years attempting to find an English–language publisher willing to undertake a translation of his work. None of the larger publishers he approached were willing to do so unless Heilmann himself was prepared to finance it, which he was unable to do. In the meantime, Heilmann took the opportunity to revise and improve his manuscript, which included information he acquired from examining the Berlin specimen of Archaeopteryx for the first time in 1923 at the invitation of Josef Felix Pompeckj, a professor at the Natural History Museum in Berlin. Examining this important specimen in person allowed Heilmann to add some additional details and revisions to his understanding of the hip, the skull, and the flight feathers. With the help of the English paleontologist Arthur Smith Woodward of the British Museum, he finally met success in finding a small London publisher willing to produce an English version of his manuscript in 1926.

=== Editions ===
While most of the original material was published in the journal of the Danish Ornithological Society between the years of 1913 and 1916, the first English version of the book was published in London in 1926 by H. F. & G. Witherby. It was published in the United States the following year by D. Appleton & Company. The book was reprinted in 1972 by Dover Publications, Inc., with the only change being the grayscale reproduction of several illustrations originally published in color.

The English and Danish editions differed in several significant ways. The English edition was somewhat shorter and more concise, and included newer information that Heilmann had acquired by studying the actual fossils of Archaeopteryx in Berlin, as well as from foreign scientists who sent him photographs and plaster casts. It also contained considerably less harsh language towards Boas and others with whom he disagreed. Curiously, the English edition did not contain the transformational sequences inspired by D'Arcy Thompson, though Heilmann still briefly acknowledged the use of his methods in reconstructing his Proavis.

== Book outline ==
Heilmann's book was divided into four main parts. The first three draw evidence for bird evolution from the fossil record, from the embryos of birds and other animals, and from living birds, respectively. The fourth and most groundbreaking section examines several groups of extinct animals in order to determine the probable root of modern birds.

=== Part I: Some Fossil Birds ===
In the first section, Heilmann examines in exquisite detail the fossil remains of several extinct birds, including Hesperornis, Ichthyornis, Archaeopteryx, and "Archaeornis", the name used commonly at the time for the Berlin specimen, which was then thought to represent a separate genus. Throughout this section are many finely detailed and labeled renderings of different parts of the skeletal anatomy of these birds, as well as other groups of extinct reptiles and some modern birds. Heilmann's attention to detail in his artwork is inspired at least in part by his dissatisfaction with anatomical renderings of these animals in scholarly works of the time, which he deemed as "unsatisfactory" and "containing misleading errors."

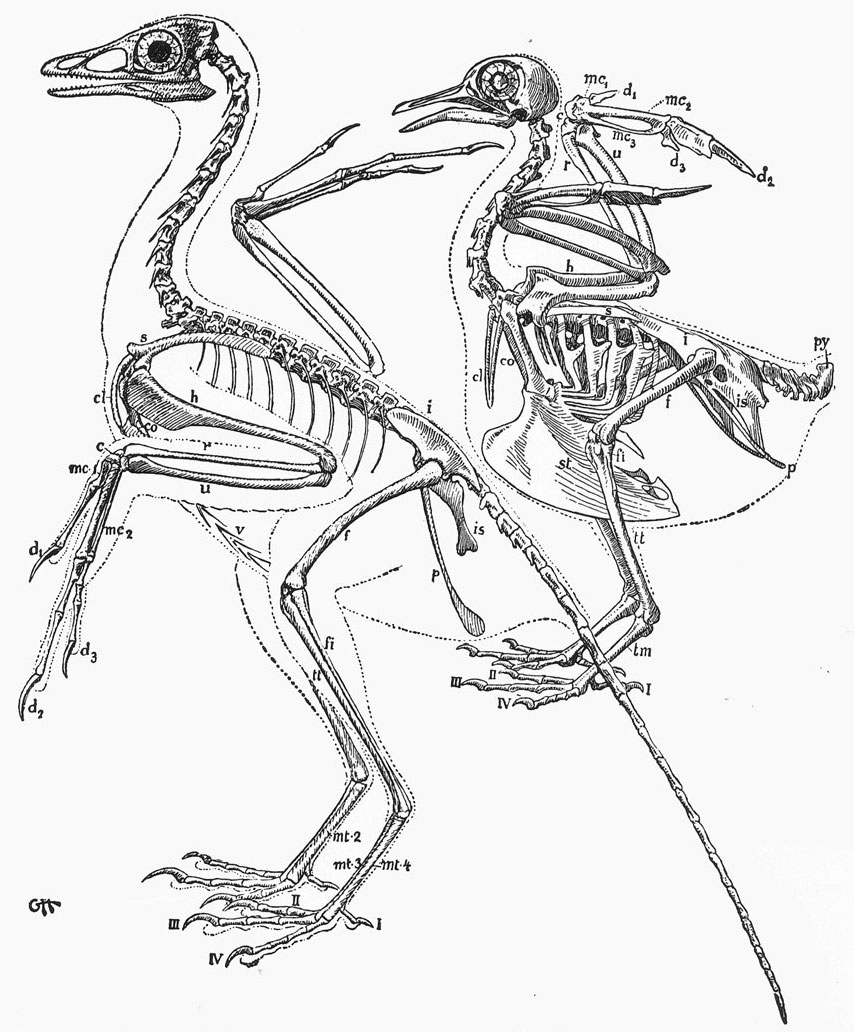
Heilmann's comparative illustration of the skeletal anatomy of Archaeopteryx and a modern pigeon

Early in this section Heilmann embarks on a thorough description of the Berlin Archaeopteryx specimen, which includes detailed comparisons to specific aspects of modern birds. Following a comparison of its skull to that of Aetosaurus, Euparkeria, and a modern pigeon, Heilmann states that he disagrees with the scientific consensus of the time that the skull of Archaeopteryx is that of a true bird. He writes that the reptilian features of the skull are much more pronounced, citing features of the teeth, fenestrae, and jaw structure as being undeniably un-birdlike. Heilmann found that much of Archaeopteryx's anatomy, in fact, was decidedly reptilian and generally opposed to that of modern birds. This included the pelvis, which lacks a pectineal process and has a very different os sacrum from modern birds, as well as the carpus, which Heilmann wrote exhibited the same phenomena found in the wrists of modern reptiles. Its tail was also noted by Heilmann as being extremely reptilian and resembling nothing known of modern birds.

He goes on to state that other features of Archaeopteryx, however, are remarkably birdlike and bear little resemblance to their reptilian analogues. The hand of Archaeopteryx is observed as being one of its most remarkable features, having what Heilmann calls a "reptilian basis" which has come to support primary feathers. He compares this to a primitive five-digit reptile hand, noting the obvious differences, before outlining the striking similarity of the hand to that of the theropod Ornitholestes. Here Heilmann goes into considerable detail about the wing arrangement of Archaeopteryx, drawing from his observation of the Berlin specimen. The latter part of this section deals with analyzing the skeletal anatomy of the fossil birds Hesperornis and Ichthyornis, but Heilmann ultimately decides that they are of no importance to his investigations. He concludes the section by stating that Archaeopteryx "may be characterized as a reptile in the disguise of a bird", and states that his studies must turn from the skeleton to the soft tissue in order to reach a final conclusion.

=== Part II: Embryonic Stages of Reptiles and Birds ===
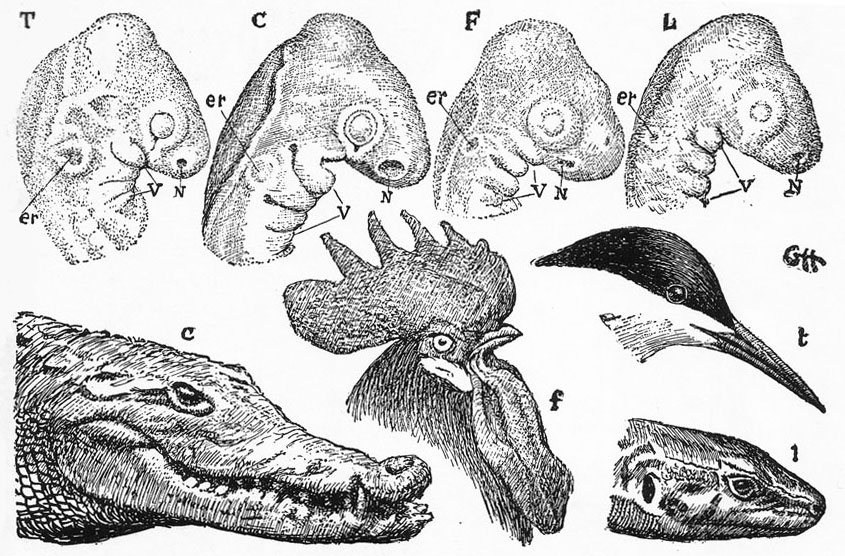
Heilmann's comparative illustrations of the embryos and adults of several extant birds and reptiles

In this section, Heilmann draws evidence from his observations of germ cells, impregnation, cell division, ontogeny and comparative embryology about the probable ancestry of birds. A fair amount of detail is devoted early in the section to comparative studies between the germ cells of many different species of extant bird and reptile (and several mammals), including some comments on the corkscrew locomotion observed in the spermatozoa cells of several bird and reptile species, but no mammals. He then goes on to offer a similar comparison between the egg cells of birds and reptiles, and finds considerably more similarity there than either has to the egg cell of a mammal. Following an analysis of the germ cells, he moves onward through the developmental cycle by next examining the process of fertilization and subsequent cleavage of the zygote. He presents here several figures and illustrations of the cleavage of the blastoderm in reptiles and birds.

He examines in detail the expression of evolutionary stages in the development of embryos, tracing from the process of cell division to the development of specific anatomical features. He finds a striking resemblance between the embryonic development of reptiles and birds, including details of the skeletal anatomy (with special attention to the hands and feet) and various organs. He notes that bird and reptile embryos develop visceral arches, hinting at their aquatic ancestry. Of more interest to his goal, Heilmann writes in a similar vein that the embryos of certain birds clearly show a three-clawed finger structure, at least one of which (the hoatzin) retains actual claws after hatching. He mentions other anatomical features of bird embryos that hint at their reptilian ancestry as well, such as the embryonic splitting of the pygostyle into distinct separate vertebrae.

=== Part III: Some Anatomical and Biological Data ===
Part III deals with anatomical comparisons between extant birds and reptiles, wherein Heilmann finds traces of the relationship between them in examples of fenestrae, claws, the brain, sense organs, sexual organs, and other features. He concludes that many of these features are "nearly identical" between reptiles and birds. He cites other features as being clearly derived from one another, such as the avian feather essentially being a cylindrical, fringed scale.

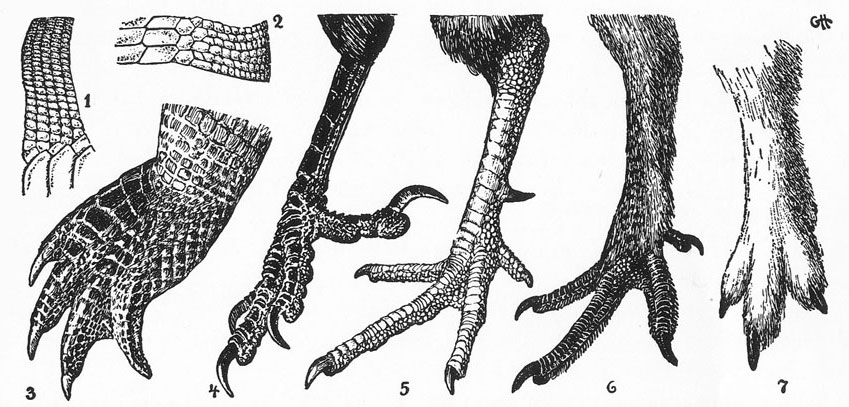
Heilmann's comparative illustrations of the feet and scale shields of various extant birds and reptiles

He begins the section with an analysis of the temporal opening found in the skull of many extant birds. After a thorough comparison, he rejects the notion, which was common at the time, that this temporal opening was homologous with the supratemporal fenestra in reptiles. Instead, he concludes that it is a recent feature. Next he makes some observations on the wing structure of modern nestling birds. He finds that some species of extant birds have claws on their first and second fingers when very young, and some, like the hoatzin, will even use these temporary claws to climb about, including in the branches of trees. He also discovers that far more nestlings have a nonfunctional claw on the first digit, and some adult birds do as well.

Organs are next examined in detail, with various comparisons drawn between reptiles and birds. He starts with the brain, analyzing in detail the cerebral and cerebellar structure of several animals including birds, crocodilians, and mammals. Though noticeably more developed, Heilmann finds that the general structure of the brain is very similar in birds and reptiles, and he describes the brain of modern birds as "further evolution of the peculiar characters already found in the reptile." He also finds the eyes of birds and reptiles to be remarkably similar, especially the development of the lens, as well as the ear, which reveals a much wider gap between the Sauropsida and mammals than with birds. He describes the sexual organs of birds and reptiles to likewise be structurally similar, and finds that while most species of male bird have lost the penis to reduce weight, those that retain it bear remarkable similarities to extant reptiles. He writes that secondary sexual characteristics are also similar between birds and reptiles, with both groups frequently utilizing bright colors and structures for display. He concludes the section by offering a few more comparisons of structures and organs, including the lungs, ambiens muscle, and beak and scale sheaths. Taken together, Heilmann interprets these many similarities as further evidence for the close kinship of birds and reptiles.

=== Part IV: The Proavian ===
In the final section Heilmann seeks to synthesize the information in the previous three sections to uncover the probable origins in a particular group of ancestors. In doing so he discusses the specific morphology of a hypothetical creature, which he refers to as "the proavian", that must have existed between modern birds and their reptilian ancestors. After making a bold assertion that birds are descended from reptiles, Heilmann cites Dollo's law of irreversibility as the primary reason why he believes birds cannot be descended from theropod dinosaurs, despite their many morphological similarities. Dollo's Law states that a feature or organ once lost by evolution cannot be regained. One consistently confounding issue Heilmann had encountered in his research into the bird-reptile link was that modern birds possess a wishbone and theropod dinosaurs, by his observations, did not. Since ancient reptilian fossils that predated dinosaurs clearly possessed a different sort of wishbone, Heilmann concluded that this feature could not have been lost and regained again over the course of evolution. Based on this law, he therefore rejected the possibility of a direct theropod ancestor of birds, though he acknowledged that theropods and birds must have shared a close relationship.

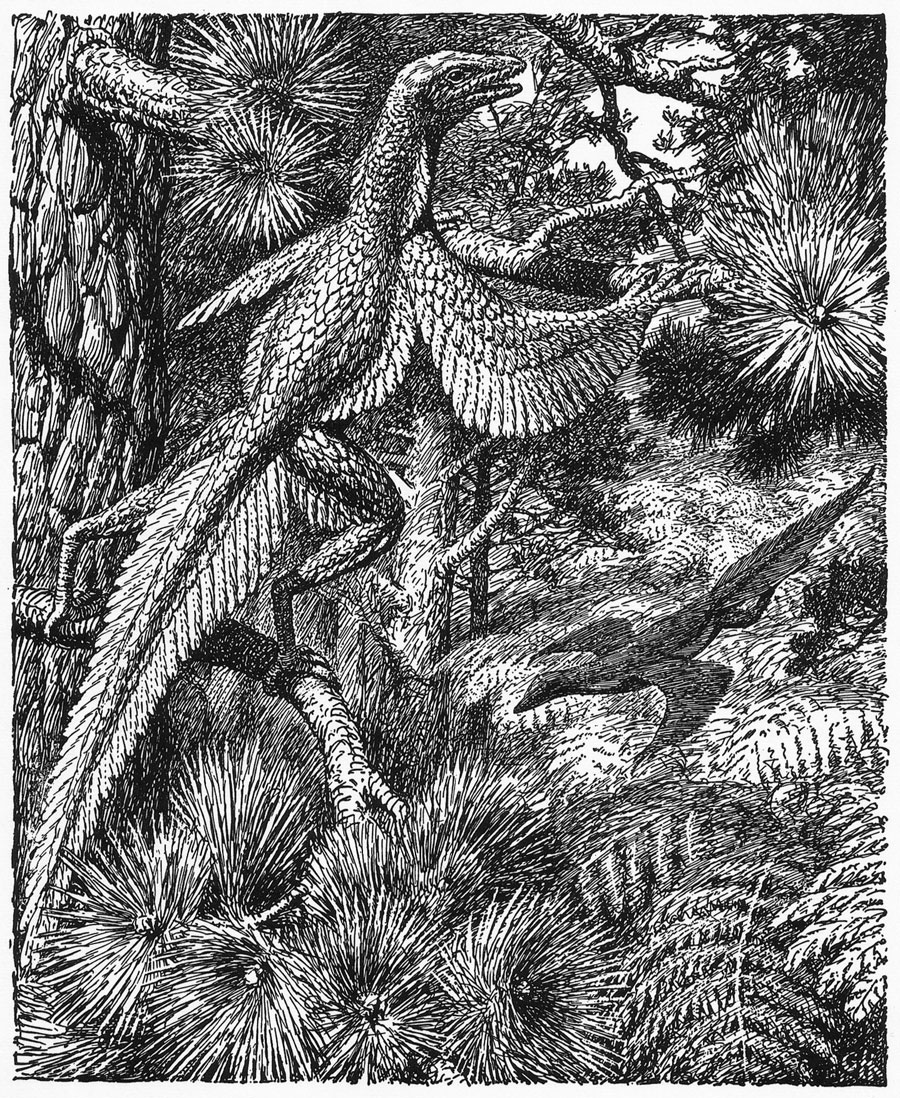
Heilmann's reconstruction of his hypothetical "Proavis"

Throughout this section, Heilmann examines several groups of possible ancestors in addition to coelurosaurs, including pterosaurs, predentates, and pseudosuchians. Based on his rejection of theropods due to the wishbone issue as well as what Heilmann saw as striking morphological similarities between the skull of Archaeopteryx, Aetosaurus and Euparkeria, Heilmann concludes that a pseudosuchian origin of birds is the most probable. The final part of this section addresses the issue of the Proavian, which Heilmann illustrated speculatively both in skeleton in a natural setting. He constructed a hypothetical skull for this animal based on a mathematical combination of the skulls of Archaeopteryx, Euparkeria, Aetosaurus, and Ornithosuchus. He constructed its skeleton in a similar manner. In this section he also compares his own Proavis to a similar sort of Proavis constructed by the American naturalist William Beebe. Heilmann examines and rejects Beebe's own Proavis (named "Tetrapteryx" by Beebe) based on his analysis of Beebe's documentation of pelvic wings in bird embryos, which Heilmann found little evidence for.

He concludes this final section by fleshing out his Proavis and summarizing his view of bird origins, in which birds would have departed from reptiles at the pseudosuchians. From this branching point, birds and dinosaurs would have evolved along parallel evolutionary tracks for millions of years, as cousins rather than ancestors. He imagines that these reptiles would have gradually assumed a bipedal gait, and transformed eventually from terrestrial runners to arboreal climbers, developing leaping capabilities ever increasing in length. Along the way, the ancestral reptilian scales would have become "frayed" and gradually developed into feathers, beginning along the forearm and tail and gradually spreading to the entire body. The need for this animal to be an adept climber would have catalyzed the lengthening of its phalanges, which would eventually become long and strong enough to support a wing. Powerful muscles would have developed to anchor these limbs, which would have reacted upon the breastbone. All of this together would have facilitated the origin of an accelerated metabolic rate, resulting in the warm-blooded state known of modern birds. This development would have occurred alongside of the enlargement of the brain, needed to coordinate and supervise these refined features. It is in this way, Heilmann concludes, the reptile has been changed into a bird.

== Legacy ==
In 1868, Thomas Huxley published On the animals which are most nearly intermediate between birds and reptiles, making a strong case for the bird-dinosaur ancestral link. Huxley's proposal that birds arose from dinosaurs – based primarily on his observation of the similarities between Archaeopteryx and Compsognathus – remained respectable and widespread in the paleontological community until the publication of The Origin of Birds. Heilmann more than anyone else was responsible for a widespread rejection of the dinosaur-bird link. His conclusions involved more than the mere rejection of a dinosaurian ancestry for birds, however: for instance, he favored the arboreal origin of avian flight, he allied birds firmly with reptiles instead of mammals, and he was responsible for finally putting an end to the idea that birds descended from pterosaurs. Several aspects of his research have continued to be influential long after its publication.

=== Wishbones and the dinosaur-bird link ===
The proposed thecodontian ancestry eventually fell out of favor, in part because the clade "thecodontia" is not monophyletic, meaning that it has no unique, diagnostic characteristics (and is largely considered an obsolete grouping today). But the principal reason why Heilmann's hypothesis was proven incorrect lies in the issue of the clavicle. Heilmann came extremely close to linking theropods and birds to one another, even going so far as to write that "it would seem a rather obvious conclusion that it is amongst the Coelurosaurs that we are to look for the bird ancestor." However, he was prevented from doing so by the apparent lack of the clavicle in the predatory dinosaurs, which reflected his strict adherence to Dollo's Law: reptilian ancestors had possessed a clavicle, but had lost it at some point during their evolution to the dinosaurs. Therefore, in order for Heilmann to believe that bird ancestry lie in the dinosaurs, there would need to be proof of clavicles in dinosaurian clades.

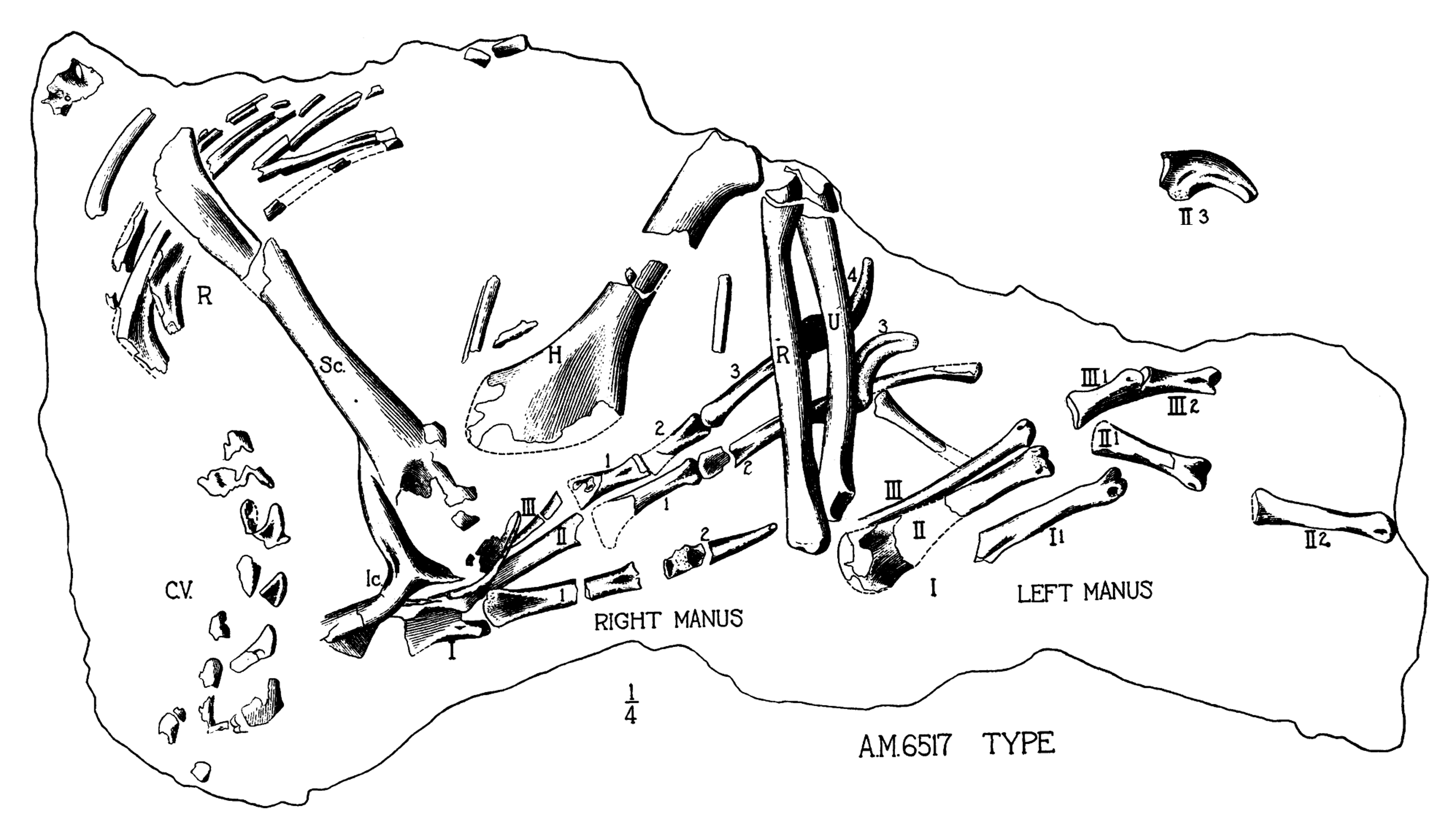
Original drawing of the 1924 Oviraptor specimen, including the misidentified wishbone

Most coincidentally, a small theropod dinosaur named Oviraptor philoceratops had been discovered while Heilmann was working on his book, and was described by Henry Fairfield Osborn in 1924. Figure 8 of Osborn's paper, redrawn from the fossil, shows what was later proven to be an oviraptorid wishbone between the animal's arms, interpreted by Osborn as the interclavicle ("Ic." in Figure 8). Unfortunately, this important structure was misidentified. If Heilmann had examined this paper as closely as he had much of his source material – or had travelled to New York to see the specimens in person – he may have reversed his conclusions entirely.

As it was, Heilmann's conclusion was so persuasive that it forestalled further debate on the subject even in the face of additional conflicting evidence. In 1936, paleontologist Charles Lewis Camp described a new theropod from the Jurassic of North America, Segisaurus. Like Oviraptor, Segisaurus had an unmistakable clavicle, but unlike Oviraptor, it was also plainly identified as being such in the paper that described it. Despite this, the implication of a wishbone-bearing dinosaur was blatantly ignored until much later, and for many years the state of dinosaur research stagnated, possibly due to the effects of the Depression and World War II.

The reinvigoration of interest in the dinosaur–bird link was largely due to the discoveries and research of paleontologist John Ostrom in the 1960s. In particular was his discovery and description of the well-preserved dromaeosaur dinosaur Deinonychus. Ostrom described Deinonychus as being extremely bird-like, with avian features such as a furcula, large sternal plates, horizontal posture, a birdlike spine, and ossified sternal ribs and uncinate processes. Ostrom's study of this animal had the effect of revolutionizing the way people thought about dinosaurs: as metabolically energetic, active predators. Some years later, Ostrom also reanalyzed the fossils of Archaeopteryx, concluding that the animal was more reptilian than originally described by Heilmann, noting in particular the similarity of its feet to those of Deinonychus, as well as a host of other features. In fact, so strong were the similarities that the hand of Archaeopteryx was later described as "a miniature version of Deinonychus's." These discoveries provided the basis for the revival of the dinosaur–ancestry hypothesis of bird origins.

=== Models of flight evolution ===
Heilmann envisioned that birds evolved from ground–dwelling animals that became arboreal and capable of jumping between branches over time. Their descendants would eventually be able to glide as the length of leaps increased, leading to greater specialization and eventual flapping capabilities. This "from the trees down" hypothesis was originally proposed by Othniel C. Marsh in 1880. This general theory about the mode of the evolution of flight in birds has persisted to modern times, especially (but not exclusively) among opponents of a theropod origin of birds. This includes paleontologists such as Alan Feduccia, who essentially agree with Heilmann's assertion that the ancestors of birds must have been arboreal.

The origin of bird flight itself is still hotly debated. It is clear that feathers must have been a prerequisite for flight in birds (though flight may have not been a prerequisite for feathers). There has yet to be a consensus on whether flight involved from the ground up or the trees down, and Heilmann was largely responsible for popularizing the trees-down idea early on. The modern idea of the arboreal (or trees-down) hypothesis has changed little since Heilmann's time, and it states that bird flight would have originated by climbing birds gliding down from the tops of trees, making gliding a precursor to flapping or powered flight. As these early birds became more efficient gliders, they would have begun to extend their range and capability by developing more powerful flight. In this proposed mode of bird evolution, Heilmann's "Proavis" is strongly implicated, which would have probably been a climbing, perching, early-stage gliding quadruped. This hypothesis for the origin of bird flight has had many adherents, including Walter J. Bock and Alan Feduccia.

Competing with the arboreal hypothesis is the idea that birds evolved from running bird ancestors, known as the cursorial (or ground up) hypothesis. This scenario may have involved ancient birds jumping or running along the ground and briefly becoming airborne, perhaps to avoid obstacles or catch insects. As these animals strove to overcome the force of gravity, powered flight may have appeared early on. They may also have used their ground speed to run up trees or other steep slopes, developing increasingly sophisticated flapping mechanism to assist with this. This model requires a highly cursorial and feathered ancestor. Proponents of the cursorial hypothesis cite the legs, feet and hands of Archaeopteryx as inheritance from a cursorial maniraptoran ancestor. This model has also had many adherents over the years, including John Ostrom and Jacques Gauthier.

The arboreal hypothesis was popular in Heilmann's day, even prior to his research, as it had been advanced by Marsh. It fell out of favor following Ostrom's research in the 1960s and 1970s, which suggested that the ancestors of birds were fast–running bipedal animals, lending credence to the cursorial model. The focus shifted back to the arboreal model when several Chinese non–avian theropods from the Early Cretaceous were found in the early 2000s. These new finds, represented chiefly by Epidendrosaurus and Microraptor, have been described as possessing features that indicate an arboreal lifestyle; Microraptor even has flight feathers on its legs, which suggest it was a glider. While the arboreal hypothesis is still popular in modern times, there are several proponents of the cursorial model and no consensus has been established. Adherence to the arboreal model is shared both by paleontologists who accept the dinosaurian ancestry of birds, and by a minority who still believe birds to have evolved from a non-dinosaurian group of reptiles. Although the arboreal model was somewhat popular before Heilmann's research, his writings helped to advance and popularize it and the idea continues to have a hold.

=== Beebe's leg-wings ===
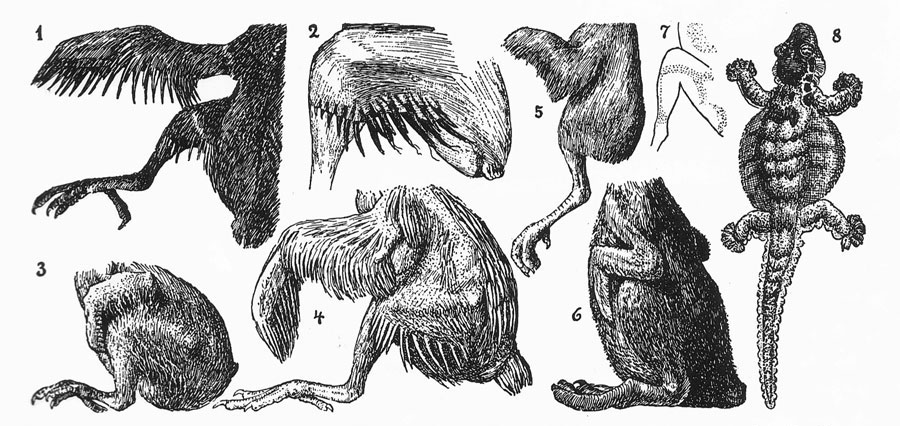
Heilmann's illustrations, redrawn from Beebe's work, showing the hindlimbs of various nestlings and one reptile

In the fourth section of The Origin of Birds, Heilmann examines the Tetrapteryx hypothesis proposed by William Beebe in 1915. This hypothesis was based on observations of bird embryos and hatchlings, which Beebe found to possess a presumably atavistic fringe of flight feathers on their hindlimbs. His main evidence came from examination of incipient quill feathers on the thigh of a four-day-old white-winged dove. He theorized based on this embryological fringe and the recapitulation theory that birds had once passed through a "Tetrapteryx" stage in their distant evolution, which he represented as a hypothetical four-winged gliding animal.

Heilmann, though excited about Beebe's idea, found little evidence for these leg-wings when studying the nestlings in the Zoological Museum collection in Copenhagen. He also examined the nestlings of more basal bird species, such as the ostrich and the emu, searching for a trace of leg-wings there, again without success. Even after studying the nestlings of birds closely related to Beebe's doves, including pigeons, he still found no trace of leg-wings. Instead he found on the nestlings' thighs "a series of permanent feathers, and no atavism. If it were a genuine relic from such a very remote past, it would make its appearance, like a glimpse, in the embryo or squab, quickly to vanish again." Heilmann went on to outline the morphological difficulties involved in such a leg-wing, indicating that it could hinder survival. In effect, Beebe's Tetrapteryx theory was completely disregarded by Heilmann, and this remained the consensus in ornithological literature until much later. Despite this, Heilmann's Proavis illustrations sport a short border of feathers behind the thigh, which some authors have suggested was inspired by Beebe's Tetrapteryx idea.

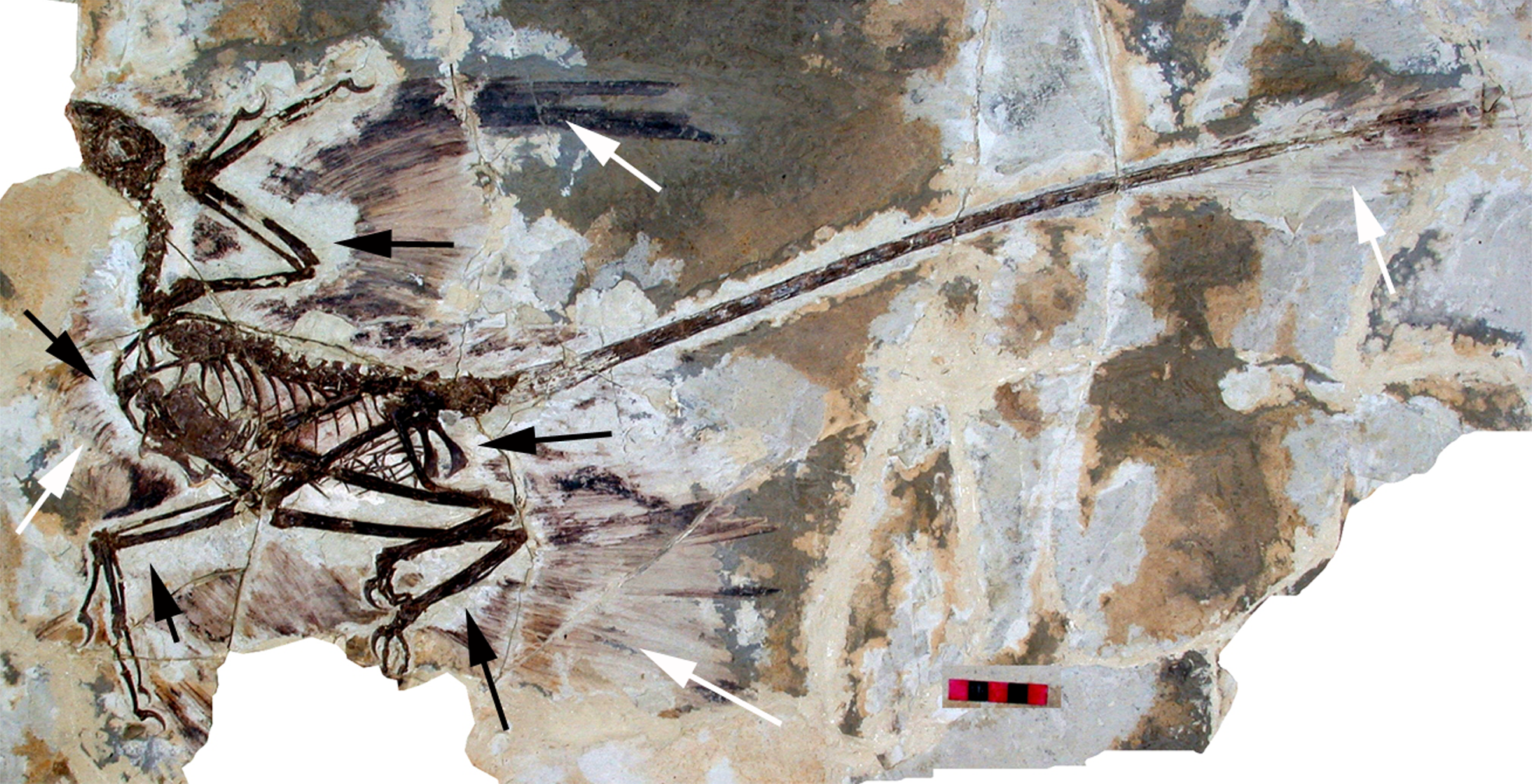
The fossil of Microraptor gui, found in 2003, clearly illustrating the existence of the leg–wings that Heilmann denied

Beebe was relatively undeterred by the scientific community's acceptance of Heilmann's rejection of his theory, as is evidenced by the fact that he was still writing about his Tetrapteryx hypothesis well into the 1940s. His adherence to his theory was well-placed, as in 2003 a revolutionary discovery was made in the early Cretaceous Jiufotang Formation of Liaoning, China: Microraptor gui, the small, four-winged dromaeosaur that had led to renewed credence of the arboreal model for the origin of bird flight. This animal's most remarkable feature was the existence of long, pennaceous feathers on both its arms and legs, forming a set of four aerodynamic wings that its discoverers theorized were used for gliding. This discovery had the immediate effect of resurrecting the idea that leg feathers may have had some bearing on the origin of flight in birds, building on the idea originally proposed by Beebe and rejected by Heilmann.

Today, Beebe's 1915 description of his hypothetical four-winged bird ancestor is regarded as prescient, and there is no doubt that Microraptor looks startlingly similar to the almost-century old Tetrapteryx illustrations. After its discovery, Microraptor had the effect of both reinvigorating the arboreal hypothesis as well as finally putting an end to the widespread acceptance of Heilmann's disregard for the Tetrapteryx theory.

== See also ==
- Proavis
