= Alan Feduccia =

American academic

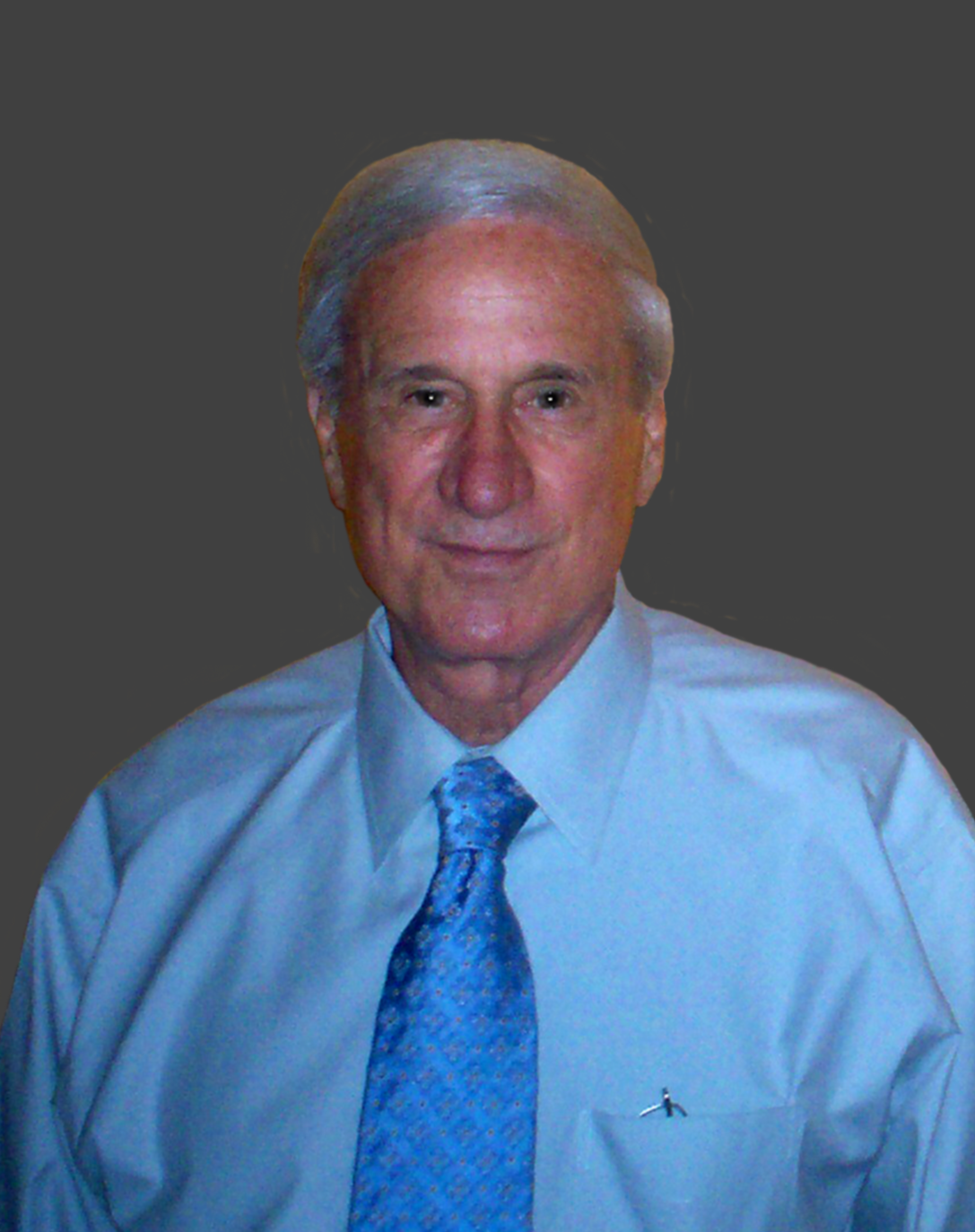
- Feduccia in 2009
- Born: John Alan Feduccia; April 25, 1943 (age 83); Mobile, Alabama
- Citizenship: United States
- Education: University of Michigan
- Awards: Fellow, American Ornithologists' Union 1974; Fellow, American Association for the Advancement of Science 1994; Albert Nelson Marquis Lifetime Achievement Award (2018)
- Scientific career
- Fields: Ornithology, Paleornithology, Paleontology, Biology
- Workplaces: University of North Carolina

John Alan Feduccia (born April 25, 1943) is a paleornithologist specializing in the origins and phylogeny of birds. He is S. K. Heninger Distinguished Professor Emeritus at the University of North Carolina. Feduccia's authored works include three major books, The Age of Birds, The Origin and Evolution of Birds, and Riddle of the Feathered Dragons.

Feduccia opposes the scientific consensus that birds originated from and are deeply nested within Theropoda, and are therefore living theropod dinosaurs. He has argued for an alternative theory in which birds share a common stem-ancestor with theropod dinosaurs among more basal archosaurian lineages, with birds originating from small arboreal archosaurs in the Triassic.

== Education ==
Feduccia graduated with a B.S. from Louisiana State University, taking ornithological expeditions to Honduras, El Salvador and Peru. He received his M.A. and Ph.D. (1969) from the University of Michigan.

== Academic career and research ==
=== Early work on bird evolution ===
Feduccia's research has focused on ornithology, evolutionary biology, vertebrate history and morphogenesis, and the tempo and mode of the Cenozoic vertebrate radiation. His early work in the 1970s focused on clarification of the evolutionary history of modern birds (Neornithes), focusing, in particular, on the identification of conserved morphological characters that might elucidate phylogeny more readily than strongly functionally correlated characters. Using this approach, in a series of publications, Feduccia analyzed the morphology of the bony stapes, the ear ossicle of birds, to help elucidate the interrelationships of passeriform birds. This approach was extended to the analysis of non-passeriform birds as well, including owls and the shoebill. Other studies in the 1970s focused on the analysis of the Cenozoic avian radiation, with a particular focus on the origin and relationships of waterfowl (Anseriformes). Based on his analysis of the osteology of the Paleocene and Eocene duck Presbyornis, represented in large quantities from Eocene deposits from outcrops of the Green River Formation in Utah and Wyoming, Feduccia concluded that Presbyornis represents a shorebird-duck mosaic and that waterfowl evolved from shorebirds (Charadriiformes). This is contrary to the more widely held view, based on molecular and morphological data, that waterfowl are most closely related to chickens, turkeys, and related fowl (Galliformes), but Feduccia argues that similarities between anseriform and galliform birds are attributable to homoplasy. Partly based on his analysis of the osteology of Presbyornis, Feduccia also argued that flamingos, the phylogenetic relationships of which remain disputed, with some recent studies suggesting a sister-group relationship with grebes, were actually derived from shorebirds. Feduccia summarized his position in the second edition of his book The Origin and Evolution of Birds: "The study of Presbyornis planted the idea that shorebirds are the basic ancestral stock for both flamingolike birds and the anseriformes, ducks and their allies...".

=== Tempo and Mode in the origin and evolution of modern birds (Neornithes) ===
Feduccia's early work on flamingos and waterfowl contributed to the development of his hypothesis that there was an explosive Cenozoic adaptive radiation of neornithine birds following the extinction event at the end of the Cretaceous. According to this hypothesis, modern orders of birds initially radiated principally from a lineage of "transitional shorebirds", perhaps represented by the shorebird form-family Graculavidae, from the Cretaceous-early Paleogene, that managed to survive the Cretaceous extinction event, perhaps through eking out a living along marginal shoreline environments. This radiation is hypothesized to have been very rapid, as many orders of modern birds have fossil representatives from the early Cenozoic but not before. This hypothesis argues that support for this scenario is shown by the existence of a similar evolutionary pattern in Cenozoic mammals and that, as a general model of evolutionary change, a Tertiary "big-bang" for modern birds would be consistent with Simpson's concept of rapid adaptive radiation following a major extinction event.

Furthermore, Feduccia has suggested that this rapid adaptive radiation of modern birds, compressed into such a short period of geologic time, might obscure interordinal relationships and make elucidation of the phylogeny of modern birds particularly difficult, barring the isolation of conserved characters or mosaic fossils demonstrating transitional character states bridging extant orders. This reiterates an early theme from his research in the 1970s, in which Feduccia had repeatedly emphasized the importance of homoplasy in evolution, and its ability to confound the interpretation of phylogeny. This has also been a theme in his study of flightlessness in birds, a phenomenon the pervasiveness of which has been stressed in his work, and the mechanisms by which flight is lost, including heterochrony and differential development. Feduccia has argued against the monophyly of the Ratitae, a conclusion consistent with recent molecular studies.

=== Opposition to theropod origin hypothesis for the origin of birds ===
Feduccia is best known for his criticisms of the hypothesis, accepted by most biologists, that birds originated from and are deeply nested within Theropoda, and are therefore living theropod dinosaurs. Feduccia's first contribution relative to the origin and early evolution of birds, and their relationship with dinosaurs, was a critical review of the evidence then available for dinosaurian endothermy in 1973. In a 1979 paper, Feduccia and Tordoff argued, against the position taken by John Ostrom, that Archaeopteryx was capable of powered flight, as indicated by the asymmetrical vanes of its primary feathers, a feature found only in flying birds. In a paper coauthored with Storrs Olson in the same year, Feduccia noted that the robust furcula of Archaeopteryx could have served as a site of attachment for a well-developed M. pectoralis major, the principal depressor of the avian wing, responsible for powering the downstroke during avian flight. Olson and Feduccia concluded that this provided further evidence for the flight capability of Archaeopteryx. These initial excursions into the subject, and the argument that Archaeopteryx was clearly a bird, albeit primitive, were expanded upon in Feduccia's 1980 book, The Age of Birds. Feduccia here criticized the theropod hypothesis for the origin of birds, but his position was largely agnostic, conceding that there was evidence in support of both a theropod ancestry of birds and an ancestry from more basal archosaurs, perhaps similar in overall morphological organization to Euparkeria. Feduccia nevertheless suggested that on the basis of closer stratigraphic fit, ancestry from basal archosaurs rather than from coelurosaurian theropods might prove a better phylogenetic hypothesis. He thus, essentially, agreed with the model for the origin of birds proposed by Gerhard Heilmann in his influential 1926 book The Origin of Birds. Feduccia also criticized "ground-up" theories for the origin of avian flight, arguing on biophysical grounds that they were implausible, and noting that in other cases in which flight has developed among vertebrates it has occurred in an arboreal context. He argued, instead, for a "trees-down" model for the origin of avian flight due to its lack of the biophysical constraints hindering "ground-up" acquisition of flight and due to the ability to call upon biologically functional stages, represented by living analogues, at each stage in the evolution of flight.

Feduccia's skepticism about the origin of birds from theropods and a "ground-up" origin of avian flight, which in the absence of any evidence for small, arboreal theropods seemed a concomitant requirement of that hypothesis, increased following publication of The Age of Birds, culminating in a series of publications in the latter half of the 1980s and the early 1990s expanding upon arguments presented in The Age of Birds. In his 1985 contribution to the Eichstatt Archaeopteryx Conference, a major international meeting on the interpretation and significance of Archaeopteryx, as well as on the origin and early evolution of birds and avian flight, held in Eichstatt, Germany, Feduccia criticized hypotheses for the evolution of feathers in non-aerodynamic contexts in endothermic small theropod dinosaurs. He argued that these hypotheses failed to account for the elaborate aerodynamic architecture of the feather vane and rachis, and that thermoregulatory functions would have been adequately served by hair, which is a developmentally simpler structure. In a 1993 paper, Feduccia analyzed claw curvature arcs in the manual and pedal claws of Archaeopteryx and other birds, and found that Archaeopteryx clustered with other arboreal birds, suggesting that it was an arboreal animal rather than a terrestrial cursor or a bird which spent any considerable time on the ground, as is argued by some other workers. In 1994, Feduccia argued that there was a "temporal paradox" due to most bird-like dinosaurs being known from the Cretaceous, while birds are thought to have originated in the Jurassic.

In other publications in the early 1990s, Feduccia expanded on earlier arguments for the evolution of feathers in a primarily aerodynamic rather than thermoregulatory context. In 1996, Feduccia published the first edition of The Origin and Evolution of Birds, a comprehensive review of his research on both early avian evolution and a synopsis of the history of the Cenozoic radiation of modern birds. The book presented a thorough overview of earlier criticisms of the theropod hypothesis for the origin of birds and a "ground-up" origin of avian flight, expanded on many of those arguments, and presented a series of new arguments questioning the hypotheses of homology advanced as evidence for the theropod hypothesis. Feduccia argued that many of the proposed homologous similarities between theropods and birds were ambiguous, and that other similarities between birds and theropods could plausibly be explained as homoplasy, particularly those in the hindlimb and pelvis. Feduccia also focused upon the discrepancy between embryological evidence identifying the digits of the avian manus as the second, third, and fourth of the primitively pentadactyl archosaur manus, and paleontological evidence indicating that theropod dinosaurs primitively reduced their fourth and fifth manual digits, eventually retaining only the first, second, and third (with further reduction in some groups, like tyrannosaurs). This emerged as a principal argument in Feduccia's research on the origin of birds, and was the subject of developmental studies of the ostrich definitively identifying first and fifth digital condensations in the embryonic hand, confirming a pentadactyl ground state for the avian manus with symmetrical reduction, unlike the situation indicated by paleontological evidence for theropods. This conclusion has been supported by some other workers.

From 2002, Feduccia has argued that the discovery of spectacular new fossils from the Cretaceous of China, like Microraptor, and other taxa with unambiguous feathers, like the oviraptorosaur Caudipteryx, suggest that there might have been an extensive, and hitherto unrecognized radiation of cryptic avian lineages, some of which rapidly lost flight and secondarily adopted a cursorial lifestyle. According to this argument, very birdlike groups like Dromaeosauridae and Oviraptorosauria, which are currently considered by most workers to be theropod dinosaurs, are thought actually to represent avian lineages, probably more derived than Archaeopteryx, that through homoplasy associated with the loss of flight and secondary acquisition of cursoriality, converged on theropod dinosaurs. Other lineages, like that represented by Microraptor and Anchiornis, are hypothesized to have been flighted. This argument represents a shift from Feduccia's earlier position in the 1990s, as he acknowledged in a 2002 paper where he first endorsed this view. Feduccia has expanded upon this argument in subsequent papers and in his book Riddle of the Feathered Dragons. He has further developed his alternative hypothesis for the origin of birds through study of the bizarre Jurassic taxon Scansoriopteryx, which he argues is a primitive bird whose morphology reflects an ancestry among basal, nondinosaurian archosaurs.

=== Currently recognized taxa named in honor of Alan Feduccia ===
- Presbyorniformipes feduccii Yang et al., 1995, an ichnofossil
- Confuciusornis feducciai Zhang et al., 2009, a primitive Cretaceous bird from China
- Feducciavis loftini Olson, 2011, a Miocene tern

=== Responses to his work ===
Feduccia's work on the origin of birds, which has historically been a divisive topic in vertebrate zoology, has been controversial. Feduccia's principal academic work, The Origin and Early Evolution of Birds, was well received by some workers, and was winner of the Association of American Publishers 1996 award for Excellence in Biology. However, it received negative reviews from several paleontologists, primarily on account of the book's criticisms of the theropod hypothesis for the origin of birds. Feduccia has been criticized for failing to use cladistics in his studies of the origin and the evolution of birds. In a 2002 paper in The Auk, the journal of the American Ornithologists' Union, Richard Prum presented a summary of the current state of the theropod hypothesis for the origin of birds, and urged its acceptance by and integration within ornithology. Feduccia responded by arguing that the origin of birds was a complex and as yet unresolved problem to which the theropod hypothesis as presently formulated was a simplistic answer, ignoring contrary evidence. Prum in turn responded to this paper by again criticizing Feduccia's failure to use cladistics and to specify an explicit alternative sister-group with which to ally birds. He particularly singled out Feduccia's adoption of the view that some theropod taxa are actually birds that have been mistaken for theropods through convergence associated with flight loss and secondary adoption of cursoriality. Prum argued, finally, that Feduccia's methodology and view of the origin and early evolution of birds are pseudoscientific. Overview of paravian phylogeny released in 2019 concludes that his theory about scansoriopterygid affinity "rest on weak evidence, and most authors do not consider them to be viable".

Several of the arguments about whether similarities between birds and theropods are homologous that have been advanced by Feduccia have been particularly contentious. One example is identification of the digits of the avian and theropod hand, and whether, and if so by what mechanism, it might be possible to explain the discrepancy between the conflicting digital identities of tridactyl theropods and birds. Wagner and Gauthier proposed that a homeotic frame shift, whereby expression domains for groups of genes like the Hox d group, were repositioned during limb bud development, resulting in the development of the first, second, and third digits of the archosaur manus from what were originally condensations for the second, third, and fourth. This view has been supported by some other workers. Another response to Feduccia's digital homology argument is the counterargument that evidence from the transitional Limusaurus inextricabilis suggests that theropods too have the three digits II, III and IV.

Feduccia's model for the origin of most orders of Neornithes in an explosive adaptive radiation after the end-Cretaceous extinction event is in conflict with some molecular evidence suggesting a deep Mesozoic origin for these taxa. It has also been argued that there is fossil evidence for the existence of multiple orders of Neornithes from the Late Cretaceous, but much of this material is fragmentary and interpretation is difficult. On the other hand, there do appear to be definitive exemplars of Anseriformes from the Late Cretaceous of Antarctica and Asteriornis from the latest Cretaceous of Belgium appears to be a galliform-anseriform mosaic; whether these finds refute the hypothesis that the principal adaptive radiation of modern birds occurred only after the end-Cretaceous extinction event is not clear, since the hypothesis is consistent with a limited adaptive radiation of neornithines in the Late Cretaceous. Sankar Chatterjee argues that the avian status of the controversial taxon Protoavis supports a deep Mesozoic origin of modern birds, but the avian status of Protoavis is disputed by most paleontologists and requires further study.

== Appearances ==
Feduccia has appeared frequently on national TV and radio, including NPR, Voice of America, BBC, CNN, ABC (Australia), NHK (Japan) and MacNeil/Lehrer Report.

Feduccia served as Chair of the Department of Biology at Chapel Hill from 1997 to 2002, and prior to that was Chair of the Division of Natural Sciences. He is an elected Fellow of the American Ornithologists' Union and the American Association for the Advancement of Science.

== Publications ==
=== Books ===
- 1975. Structure and Evolution of Vertebrates. New York: W. W. Norton. 1974. ISBN 0-393-09291-7.
- 1980. The Age of Birds (1st ed.). Cambridge: Harvard University Press. 1980. ISBN 0-674-00975-4.
- 1985. Catesby's Colonial Birds of America. Chapel Hill: University of North Carolina Press. 1985. ISBN 0-8078-1661-2.
- 1989. Birds of Colonial Williamsburg. Williamsburg: The Colonial Williamsburg Foundation. July 1989. ISBN 0-87935-113-6.
- 1999. Torrey's Morphogenesis of the Vertebrates (5th ed.). New York: John Wiley & Sons. January 24, 1991. ISBN 978-0-471-62314-4. Coauthored with Edward MacCrady.
- 1999. The Origin and Evolution of Birds (2nd ed.). New Haven: Yale University Press. 1999. ISBN 978-0-300-07861-9.
- 2012. Riddle of the Feathered Dragons. New Haven: Yale University Press. January 20, 2012. ISBN 978-0-300-16435-0.
- 2020. Romancing the Birds and Dinosaurs: Forays in Postmodern Paleontology. Brown Walker Press. 2020. ISBN 978-1-59942-606-8.

=== Monographs ===
- 1973. Evolutionary trends in the neotropical Ovenbirds and Woodhewers. Ornithological Monographs 13.
- 1975. Morphology of the bony stapes (columella) in the Passeriformes and related groups: evolutionary implications. University of Kansas Museum of Natural History Miscellaneous Publications 63.
- 1980. with Storrs Olson (senior author). Relationships and evolution of flamingos (Aves: Phoenicopteridae). Smithsonian Contributions to Zoology 316.
- 1980. with Storrs Olson (senior author). Presbyornis and the origin of the Anseriformes (Aves: Charadriomorphae). Smithsonian Contributions to Zoology 323.
- 1982. with Storrs Olson. Morphological similarities between the Menurae and the Rhinocryptidae, relict passerine birds of the southern hemisphere. Smithsonian Contributions to Zoology 366.

=== Selected recent papers ===
- Burke, A. C.; Feduccia, A. (1997). "Developmental patterns and the identification of homologies in the avian hand". Science. 278 (5338): 666–669. Bibcode:1997Sci...278..666B. doi:10.1126/science.278.5338.666.
- Feduccia, A. (1999). "1,2,3=2,3,4: accommodating the cladogram". Proceedings of the National Academy of Sciences USA. 96 (9): 4740–4742. Bibcode:1999PNAS...96.4740F. doi:10.1073/pnas.96.9.4740. PMC 33564. PMID 10220360.
- Feduccia, A. (2002). "Birds are dinosaurs: simple answer to a complex problem". Auk. 119 (4): 1187–1201. doi:10.1642/0004-8038(2002)119[1187:BADSAT]2.0.CO;2. S2CID 86096746.
- Feduccia, A.; Nowicki, J. (2002). "The hand of birds revealed by early ostrich embryos". Naturwissenschaften. 89 (9): 391–393. Bibcode:2002NW.....89..391F. doi:10.1007/s00114-002-0350-y. PMID 12435089. S2CID 6782198.
- Feduccia, A. (2003). ""Big bang" for Tertiary birds?" (PDF). Trends in Ecology and Evolution. 18 (4): 172–176. doi:10.1016/S0169-5347(03)00017-X.
- Feduccia, A.; Lingham-Soliar, T.; Hinchliffe, J. R. (2005). "Do feathered dinosaurs exist? Testing the hypothesis on neontological and paleontological evidence" (PDF). Journal of Morphology. 266 (2): 125–166. doi:10.1002/jmor.10382. PMID 16217748. S2CID 15079072.
- Feduccia, A.; Martin, L. D.; Tarsitano, S. (2007). "Archaeopteryx 2007: Quo vadis?". Auk. 124: 373–380. doi:10.1642/0004-8038(2007)124[373:PIOAQV]2.0.CO;2.
- Feduccia, A. (2013). "Bird origins anew". Auk. 130: 1–12. doi:10.1525/auk.2013.130.1.1. S2CID 21597140.
- Czerkas, S. A.; Feduccia, A. (2014). "Jurassic archosaur is a non-dinosaurian bird". Journal of Ornithology. 155 (4): 841–851. doi:10.1007/s10336-014-1098-9. S2CID 7918481.
- Feduccia, A. (2014). "Avian extinction at the end of the Cretaceous: assessing the magnitude and subsequent explosive radiation" (PDF). Cretaceous Research. 50: 1–15. doi:10.1016/j.cretres.2014.03.009.
