= A. L. V. Manniche =

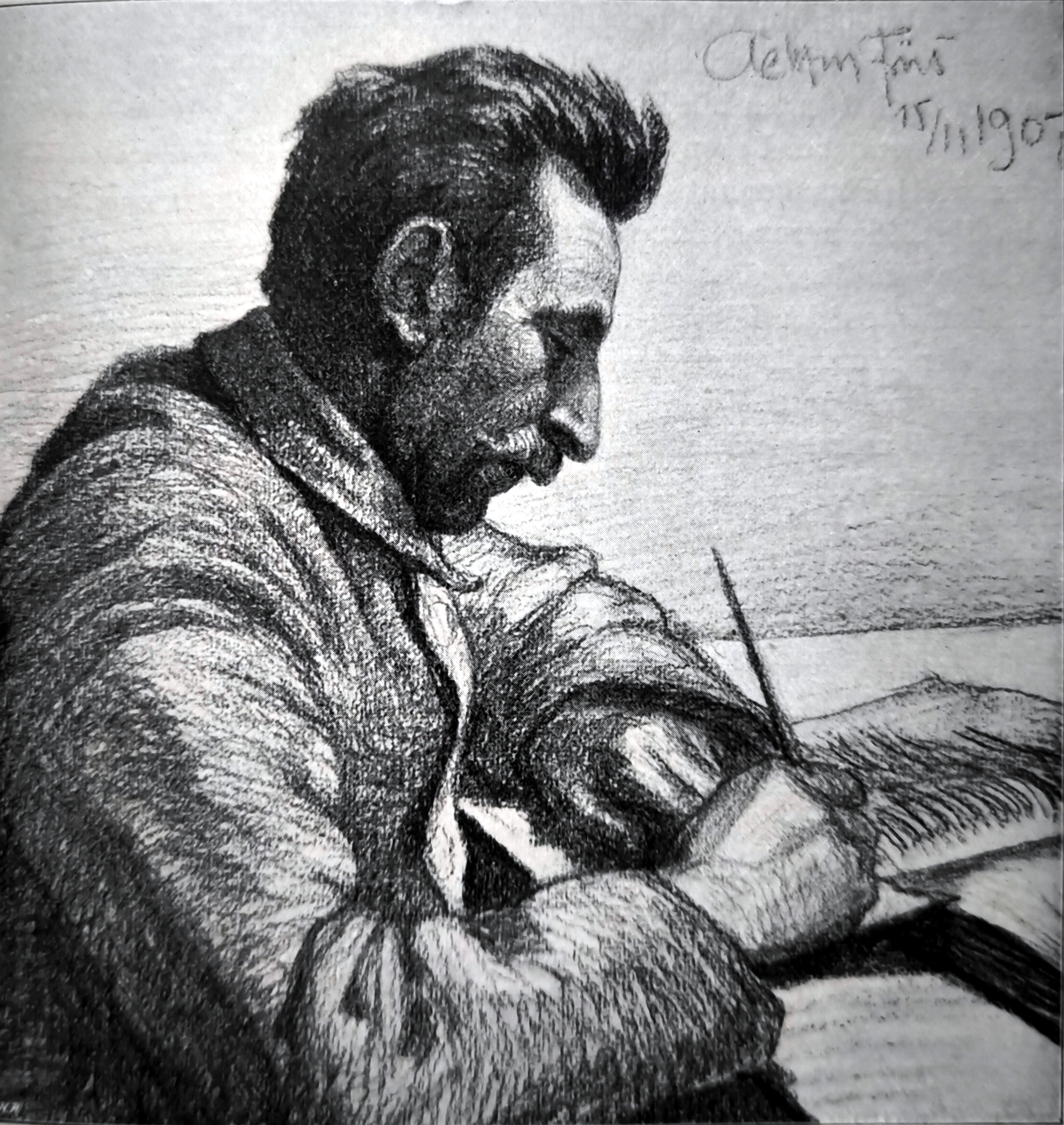
Sketch by Achton Friis

Arner Ludvig Valdemar Manniche (19 February 1867 – 7 January 1957) was a Danish zoologist and hunter. He took part in expeditions to Greenland, collecting birds and mammals from the region. He wrote several books including a three-volume work on the birds of Denmark. A lake in northeast Greenland is named after him as Manniche Sø.

Manniche was born in Gundsømagle to saddler Salomon Ludvig (1821–1905) and Malene Johansen (1847–1932). He grew up in a scenic region and gained an early interest in natural history and birds. He trained and qualified as a teacher in 1890 from the Jonstrup Seminarium and taught in East Jutland and then at Roskilde (1896–1906), taking an interest in the birds of the regions. He joined Mylius Erichsen's expedition to Greenland in 1906 as a zoologist and made collections. He later became a curator of the private collections of Lehn Schiøler. He joined the Østgrønlandsk Kompagni (Nanok East Greenland Fishing Company) around 1919 and collected specimens from Greenland. In 1926 he wrote on the Danish songbirds and from 1928 to 1930 he wrote a three-volume work on the birds of Denmark with illustrations made by Gerhard Heilmann. A second edition was made in 1939.
