= Robert Hutzen Stamm =

Danish zoologist (1877–1934)

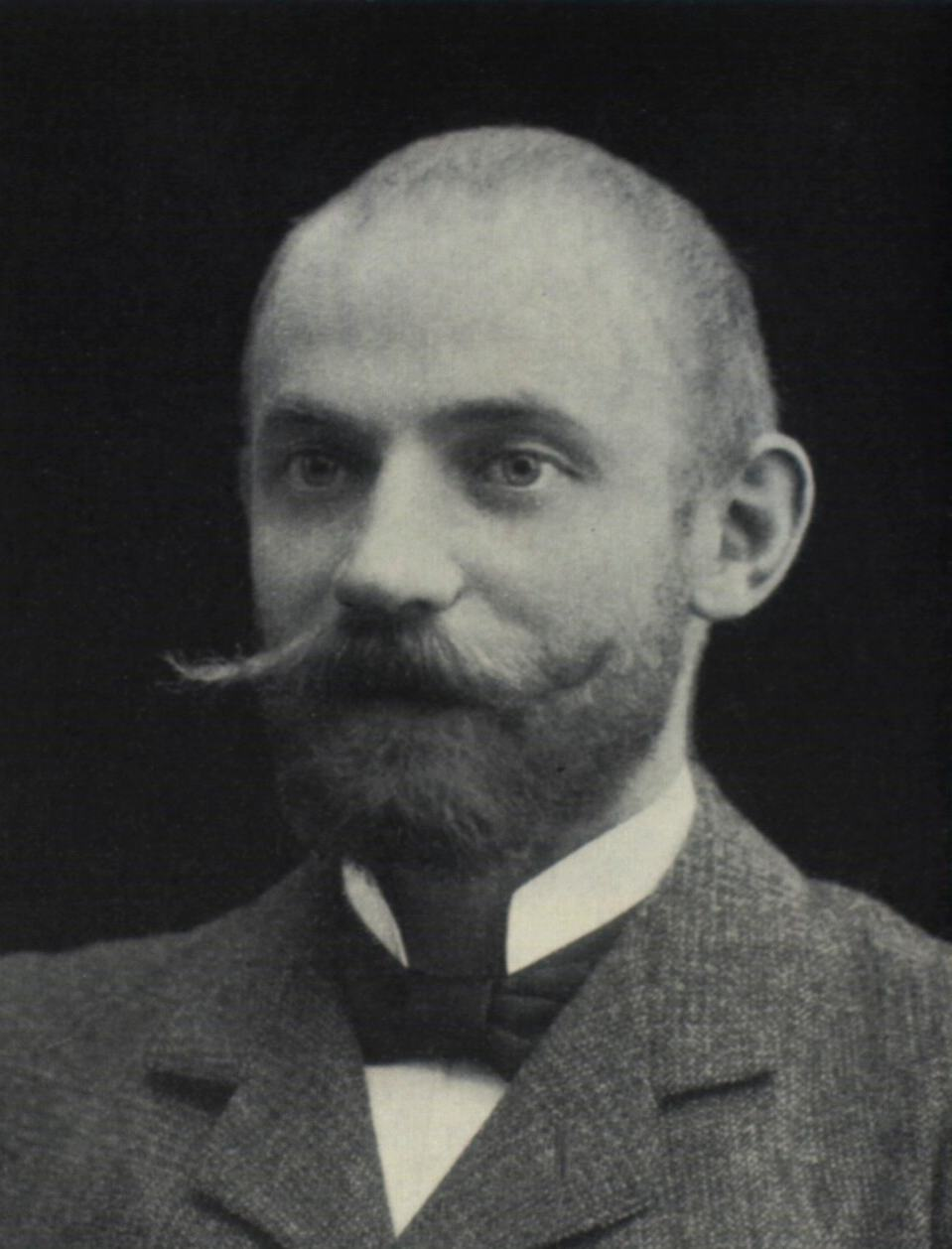
- Born: 8 April 1877; Copenhagen, Denmark
- Died: 18 February 1934 (aged 56)

Robert Hutzen Stamm (8 April 1877 – 18 February 1934) was a Danish zoologist who headed the histological and embryological laboratory of the University of Copenhagen.

== Biography ==
Stamm was born in Copenhagen, son of school inspector C. H. Stamm. Graduating from the metropolitan school in 1895, he spent some time studying natural history and zoology and became magister scientiarum in 1901. In 1908, he became a docent and headed the histological laboratory of the University of Copenhagen. He worked on the muscles of the integument and on various anatomical studies. From 1920 he was an editor of the journal of the Danish Ornithological Society. He also served as an evaluator of zoology at the college of agriculture. From 1905 to 1926 he was a member of the committee for nature conservation.

Stamm assisted Gerhard Heilmann in his paleontological work, but he did not like Heilmann's attacks on professional zoologists.
