= John Ostrom =

American paleontologist

- John Ostrom and Deinonychus skeleton cast. Photo courtesy Yale University.
- Born: February 18, 1928; New York City, New York
- Died: July 16, 2005 (aged 77); Litchfield, Connecticut
- Education: Union College (BS); Columbia University (PhD)
- Known for: The "Dinosaur renaissance"
- Awards: Hayden Memorial Geological Award (1986); Romer-Simpson Medal (1994)
- Scientific career
- Fields: Paleontology
- Doctoral students: Robert T. Bakker; Thomas Holtz

John Harold Ostrom (February 18, 1928 – July 16, 2005) was an American paleontologist who revolutionized the modern understanding of dinosaurs. Ostrom's work inspired what his pupil Robert T. Bakker has termed a "dinosaur renaissance".

Beginning with the discovery of Deinonychus in 1964, Ostrom challenged the widespread belief that dinosaurs were slow-moving lizards (or "saurians"). He argued that Deinonychus, a small two-legged carnivore, would have been fast-moving and warm-blooded.

Further, Ostrom's work made zoologists question whether birds should be considered an order of Reptilia instead of their own class, Aves. The idea that dinosaurs were similar to birds was first proposed by Thomas Henry Huxley in the 1860s, but was dismissed by Gerhard Heilmann in his influential book The Origin of Birds (1926). Prior to Ostrom's work, the development of birds was generally believed to have split off early on from that of dinosaurs.

Ostrom showed more bird-like traits common in dinosaurs and proved that birds themselves are coelurosaurian theropod dinosaurs. The first of Ostrom's broad-based reviews of the osteology and phylogeny of the primitive bird Archaeopteryx appeared in 1976. Ostrom lived to see the eventual discovery of feathered dinosaurs in northeastern China, confirming his theories about dinosaurs being progenitors of birds, and the existence of dinosaurs with feathered plumage.

== Early life and education ==
Ostrom was born in New York on February 18, 1928 and grew up in Schenectady. As a pre-medical undergraduate student at Union College, he originally aimed to prepare for medical school in order to become a physician like his father. However, an elective course in geology and George Gaylord Simpson's book The Meaning of Evolution inspired him to change his career plans. He earned his bachelor's degree in biology and geology from Union College in 1951.

Ostrom enrolled at Columbia University as a graduate student with Ned Colbert as his advisor. In 1951 Simpson invited Ostrom to spend the summer as a field assistant in the San Juan Basin of New Mexico. Ostrom also worked as a research assistant with Colbert, who was the Curator of Vertebrate Paleontology at the American Museum of Natural History (AMNH), Ostrom earned his doctorate in geology (vertebrate paleontology) in 1960 with a thesis on North American hadrosaurs that was based on the skull collection housed at the AMNH.

In 1952 Ostrom married Nancy Grace Hartman (d. 2003). They had two daughters, Karen and Alicia.

== Career ==
Ostrom taught for one year at Brooklyn College in 1955 before joining the faculty at Beloit College the following year. In 1961 he accepted a professorship at Yale University, where he remained throughout his career. As a new professor at Yale, Ostrom was named the assistant curator for vertebrate paleontology at the Peabody Museum of Natural History. He became full professor and curator in 1971.

Throughout his career, Ostrom led and organized fossil-hunting expeditions to Wyoming and Montana. He worked in the Cloverly Formation Site in Montana and Wyoming from 1962 to 1966. By 1964, he had made 10 expeditions to the Big Horn Basin, in Wyoming, east of Yellowstone National Park. Late in 1964, he discovered Deinonychus fossils near the town of Bridger, Montana. He also discovered and named Tenontosaurus fossils from the Cloverly Formation. In 1966 John H. Ostrom helped to establish Dinosaur State Park in Rocky Hill, Connecticut ("because the governor was besieged by letters from schoolchildren swayed into dino-mania by Ostrom".).

Ostrom edited the American Journal of Science, published over a dozen books for both scientific and lay audiences. He was the recipient of numerous awards and honors. In the 1960s, Ostrom wrote a paleontology themed guide for the National Park Service's National Natural Landmarks (NNLs) Program. He recommended 20 sites for designation and protection as NNLs, of which 13 became designated landmarks.

Others sites such as the Charles O. Wolcott Quarry near Manchester, Connecticut have since been destroyed. As early as October 20, 1884, stones from the Wolcott Quarry, reportedly containing fossils, were used to build a local bridge. In 1969, Ostrom surveyed over 60 bridges to find the missing blocks. They were part of a bridge over Hop Creek at Bridge Street which was scheduled for replacement. The highway department allowed Ostrom and his team to examine 400 sandstone blocks to find dinosaur fossils. Despite lobbying to preserve it, a shopping mall was built on the site of the Charles O. Wolcott Quarry in 2000.

Ostrom officially retired from Yale in 1992, but continued to write and research as a professor emeritus until his health failed. Ostrom died from complications of Alzheimer's disease in July 2005 at the age of 77 in Litchfield, Connecticut.

== Key discoveries ==
In the field of paleontology, Ostrom is responsible for the following key discoveries:

=== Hadrosaurs ===
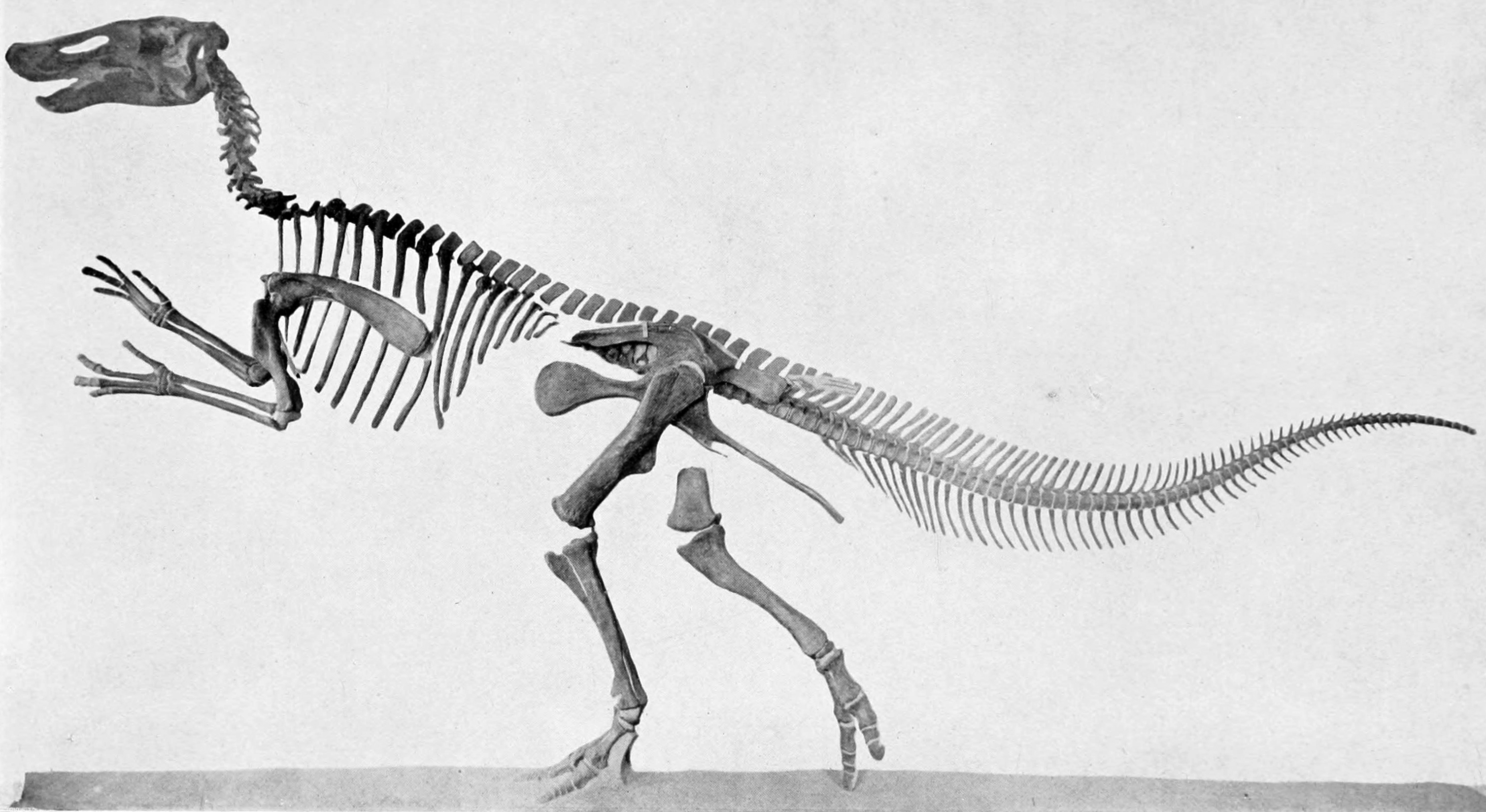
Skeleton of the hadrosaur Anatosaurus (now E. annectens) paratype YPM 2182 at the Yale University Museum showing its upright posture.

Ostrom's work first achieved international attention with his studies of the unique hadrosaur nasal apparatus, which had not been convincingly explained by the early 1960s. By examining the olfactory apparatuses of modern reptiles and drawing comparisons via comparative morphology, Ostrom concluded that hadrosaurs likely developed an acute sense of smell by a lengthening of the nasal passages into long chambers that wound around the skull and were protected by bony crests. He speculated in a subsequent paper that hadrosaurs had need for such an acute sense of smell as a defense against larger carnivorous dinosaurs, of which the hadrosaur body plan had little in the way of armor and speed.

This hypothesis led Ostrom to further conclude that ecology of hadrosaurs was more likely to be that of dry ground such as conifer forests, rather than swampy, aquatic environments, thought to be the case at the time. This idea was further justified by a 1922 paper that Ostrom rediscovered in 1964, which described the stomach contents of a mummified specimen of the hadrosaur Anatosaurus, which included conifer needles, twigs, fruit and seeds, plant matter that would be consumed in a terrestrial environment.

In the 1970s, Ostrom examined trackways at the Dinosaur Footprints Reservation in Holyoke, Massachusetts. He mapped the site, identifying preserved dinosaur tracks in the sandstone beds of various sizes and species. Ostrom's reading of fossilized Hadrosaurus trackways led him to the conclusion that these duckbilled dinosaurs were gregarious and traveled in herds.

=== Deinonychus ===
External videos
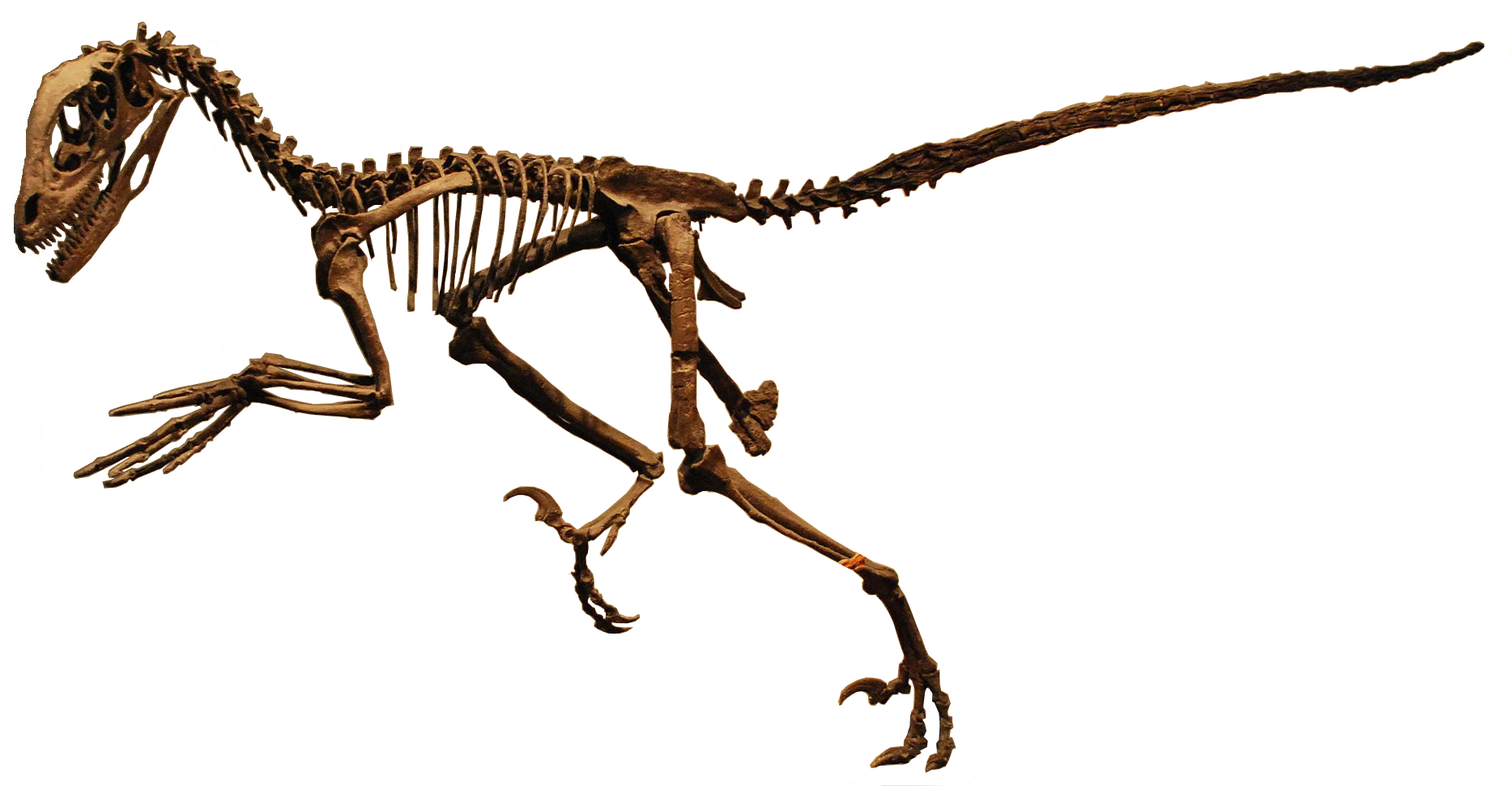
- "The Raptor That Made Us Rethink Dinosaurs", PBS.

Ostrom worked in the Cloverly Formation Site in Montana and Wyoming from 1962 to 1966. Late in 1964, he detected unfamiliar fossils in the Bridger Fossil Area, near the town of Bridger, Montana. In subsequent seasons, his team unearthed four specimens of a small bipedal carnivorous theropod, and parts of a larger plant-eating dinosaur. The discovery of the Deinonychus fossils is considered one of the most important fossil finds in history.

Deinonychus was an active predator that clearly killed its prey by leaping and slashing or stabbing with its "terrible claw", the meaning of the animal's genus name. Ostrom also suggested that it had hunted in packs. John Ostrom's work on the functional morphology of dinosaurs found that the claws and tendon scars in the tail would indicate a running position. Evidence of a truly active lifestyle included long strings of muscle running along the tail, providing a stiff counterbalance for jumping and running. This changed the posture of bipedal dinosaurs to one of agile, fast-running, fearsome predators. He concluded that at least some dinosaurs had a high metabolism and were in some cases warm-blooded. This position was further popularized by Ostrom's student Robert T. Bakker.

This helped to change the impression of dinosaurs as sluggish, slow, cold-blooded lizards, which had prevailed since the turn of the century. The implications of Deinonychus changed depictions of dinosaurs both by professional illustrators and as perceived by the public eye. Museums worldwide changed their dinosaur bone displays. The altered view of dinosaurs inspired a new generation of dinosaur movies such as Jurassic Park, which based its murderous "Velociraptors" on Deinonychus.

Ostrom's work on Deinonychus is credited with triggering the "dinosaur renaissance", a term coined in a 1975 issue of Scientific American by Bakker to describe increased interest in paleontology. The "dinosaur renaissance" continues, with scientists describing new species of dinosaurs every year and expanding the understanding of dinosaur biology.

=== Energy and climate ===
Due in large part to his earlier research on hadrosaurs—and his conclusion that they were likely upright, terrestrial animals rather than sluggish, swamp-bound lizards—Ostrom was one of the first paleontologists to grasp the implications of the amount of energy it would take such large animals (and their still larger predators, such as Tyrannosaurus rex) to stand and move erect. At the first North American Paleontological Convention, held at the Chicago Field Museum in 1969, Ostrom spoke out against the accepted wisdom that Mesozoic climates were universally tropical and that such warm climates would be necessary to sustain large animals with lizard-like metabolisms. Ostrom supported this view by noting the correlation of erect posture and locomotion with high metabolism and body temperature in modern mammals and birds, stating that this relationship cannot be accidental.

The observation that dinosaurs, thought to be uniformly cold-blooded at the time, could not be used as indicators of paleoclimate was further validated in 1973 with the discovery of hadrosaur fossils above the Cretaceous Canadian Arctic Circle by the Canadian paleontologist Dale Russell. Ostrom's reappraisal of dinosaurs as endothermic was considered radical at the time, but its ability to resolve outstanding contradictions in dinosaur physiology immediately drew many followers, and would be supported by many future discoveries.

=== Archaeopteryx and the origin of flight ===
Ostrom's interest in the dinosaur-bird connection started with his study of what became known as the Haarlem Archaeopteryx. Discovered in 1855, it was actually the first specimen recovered but, incorrectly labeled as Pterodactylus crassipes, it languished in the Teylers Museum in the Netherlands. Ostrom's 1970 paper (and 1972 description) identified it as one of only four specimens known to exist at that time. In his 1973 paper in Nature, "The Ancestry of Birds", Ostrom argued for a coelurosaurian (Theropoda) ancestry of birds, based on the skeletal anatomy of Archaeopteryx. He suggested that dinosaurs, far from becoming extinct, had evolved into a wide variety of descendants in the form of birds. Ostrom's work led to a revolution in the classification of fossils and the understanding of dinosaur-bird lineages.

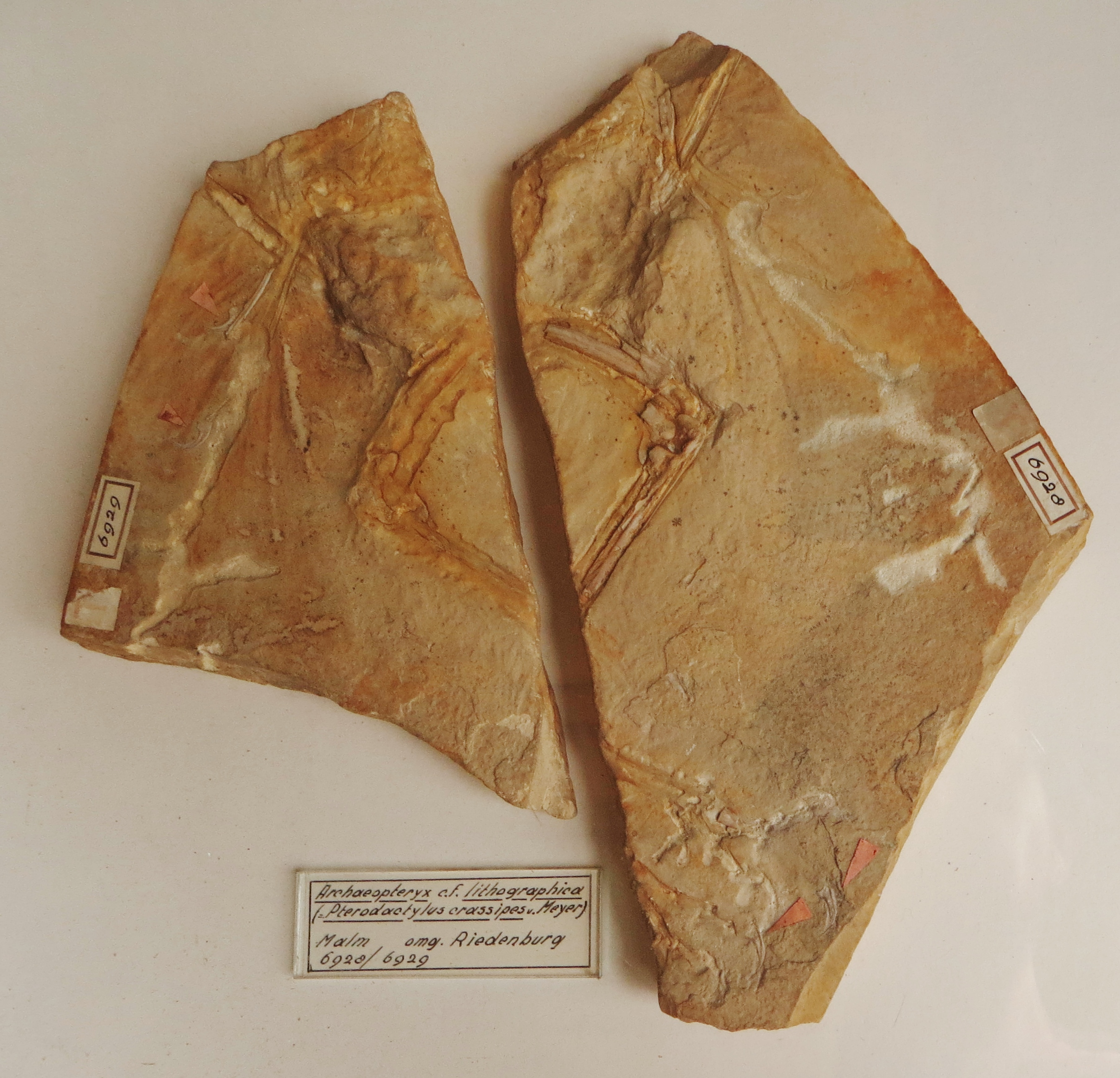
Ostromia crassipes, previously known as the Haarlem Archaeopteryx

As a result of subsequent research and comparison with more recently found specimens from the Tiaojushan Formation of China, it was suggested in 2017 that the Haarlem Archaeopteryx actually represents a separate taxon. The genus has been given the generic name Ostromia, after John Ostrom. The Haarlem fossil is now considered to be of the species Ostromia crassipes. It is the first representative of the basal avialian clade Anchiornithidae to be found outside eastern Asia.

In considering the possible evolution of flight, Ostrom theorized that birds might have evolved the ability for powered flight as a result of cursorial, or ground-upward movement such as leaping up to capture prey. This position was opposed to the arboreal hypothesis in which activities such as gliding down from trees were suggested to have been a precursor to flight.

== Awards and honors ==
Ostrom received numerous accolades recognizing his significant contributions to paleontology:

- John Simon Guggenheim Fellowship (1966–1967)
- Alexander von Humboldt Foundation Fellowship, Germany (1976–1977 and 1985)
- Hayden Memorial Geological Award, Academy of Natural Sciences of Philadelphia (1986)
- Romer-Simpson Medal, Society of Vertebrate Paleontology (1994)
- Addison Emery Verrill Medal, Yale Peabody Museum of Natural History (1999)

In 1999, Yale University hosted an international symposium in Ostrom's honor, focusing on the origin and early evolution of birds. The event, attended by over 400 scientists, coincided with the exhibition "China's Feathered Dinosaurs" at the Yale Peabody Museum, showcasing significant fossil discoveries from Liaoning Province, China. Ostrom regarded these findings as pivotal evidence supporting the evolutionary link between dinosaurs and birds.

== Scientific classification ==
- In 1970, John Ostrom gave Microvenator celer its formal name (meaning "fast small hunter").
- Also in 1970, he named Tenontosaurus tilletti (meaning "tendon lizard").
- In 1993, James Kirkland, Robert Gaston, and Donald Burge named a fossil Utahraptor ostrommaysi for John Ostrom and Chris Mays. The largest discovered example of this species is 23 feet long and had an estimated live weight over 1000 pounds.
- In 1998, Catherine Forster named a fossil Rahonavis ostromi (meaning "Ostrom's menace from the clouds") in honour of John Ostrom. The fossil is that of a primitive winged creature with a two-foot wingspan, feathers and a sickle-shaped claw on its second toe designed for slashing prey, similar to Deinonychus and Archaeopteryx.
- In 2017, Ostromia (a new genus named for the Haarlem specimen, formerly of Archaeopteryx) was named in his honor.

== Selected publications ==
- Ostrom, J. H. (1961). "Cranial morphology of the hadrosaurian dinosaurs of North America" (PDF). Bulletin of the AMNH. 122 (2).
- Ostrom, John H. (1962). "The cranial crests of hadrosaurian dinosaurs". Postilla. 62: 1–29.
- Ostrom, John H. (1964). "A reconsideration of the paleoecology of hadrosaurian dinosaurs". American Journal of Science. 262 (8): 975–997. Bibcode:1964AmJS..262..975O. doi:10.2475/ajs.262.8.975.
- Ostrom, John H. (1969). "Osteology of Deinonychus antirrhopus, an unusual theropod from the Lower Cretaceous of Montana" (PDF). Bulletin of the Peabody Museum of Natural History. 30.
- Ostrom, John H. (1 June 1972). "Were some dinosaurs gregarious?". Palaeogeography, Palaeoclimatology, Palaeoecology. 11 (4): 287–301. Bibcode:1972PPP....11..287O. doi:10.1016/0031-0182(72)90049-1. ISSN 0031-0182.
- Ostrom, JH (1972). "Description of the Archaeopteryx specimen in the Teyler museum, Haarlem". Proc K Ned Akad van Wet B. 75: 289–305.
- Ostrom, John (March 9, 1973). "The Ancestry of Birds" (PDF). Nature. 242 (5393): 136. doi:10.1038/242136a0. S2CID 29873831.
- Ostrom, John H. (May 1975). "The Origin of Birds". Annual Review of Earth and Planetary Sciences. 3 (1): 55–77. Bibcode:1975AREPS...3...55O. doi:10.1146/annurev.ea.03.050175.000415. ISSN 0084-6597.
- Ostrom, John H. (June 1976). "Archaeopteryx and the origin of birds" (PDF). Biological Journal of the Linnean Society. 8 (2): 91–182. doi:10.1111/j.1095-8312.1976.tb00244.x.
- Ostrom, J. H.; Wellnhofer, P. (1986). "The Munich specimen of Triceratops with a revision of the genus" (PDF). Zitteliana. 14: 111–158.
- Burnham, D. A.; Bakker, R. T.; Currie, P. J.; Ostrom, J. H.; Kraig, L. D.; Zhou, Z. (2000). "Remarkable new birdlike dinosaur (Theropoda: Maniraptora) from the Upper Cretaceous of Montana". University of Kansas Paleontological Contributions. 13: 1–14.
