= Gerhard Heilman =

Danish artist and paleontologist

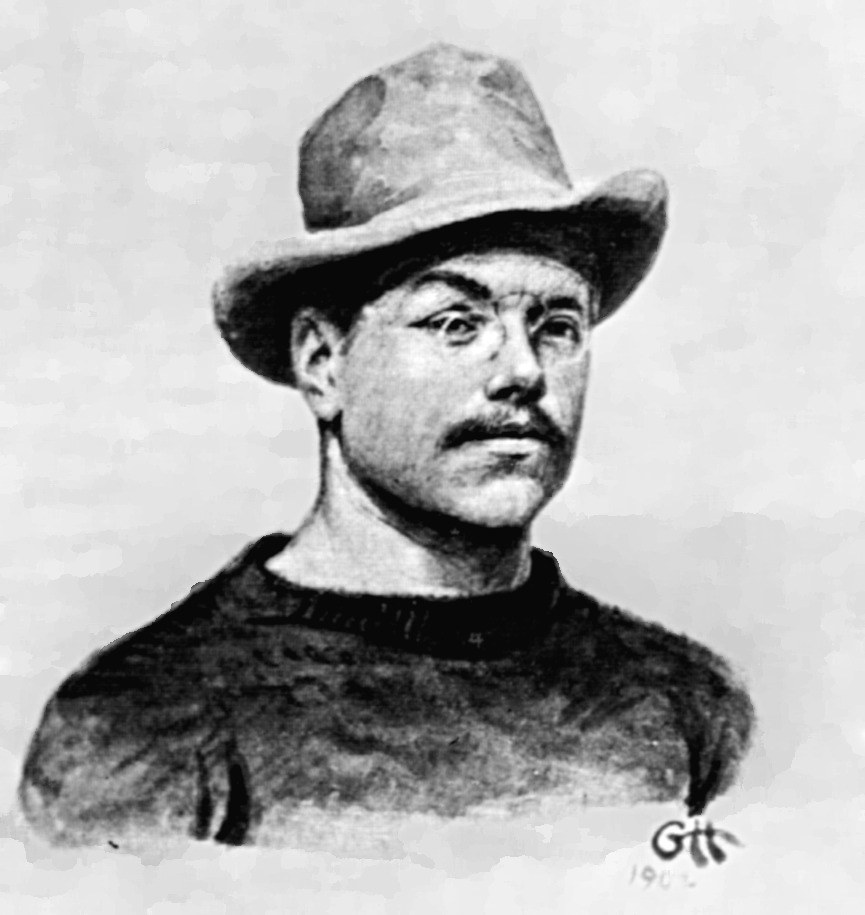
Self-portrait, 1912

Gerhard Heilman (before 1942 as "Heilmann") (25 June 1859 – 26 March 1946) was a Danish artist and paleontologist who created artistic depictions of Archaeopteryx, Proavis and other early bird relatives apart from writing the 1926 book The Origin of Birds, a pioneering and influential account of bird evolution. Heilman lacked a formal training in science although he studied medicine briefly before shifting to art. His ideas on bird evolution were first written in Danish in the Dansk Ornitologisk Tidsskrift. Heilman received little help and often got considerable opposition from Danish professional zoologists of the time and he in turn often made dismissive remarks on the ideas of some of the established scientists of the time. The English edition however reached out to a much larger audience and influenced ideas in bird evolution for nearly half a century.

== Life ==
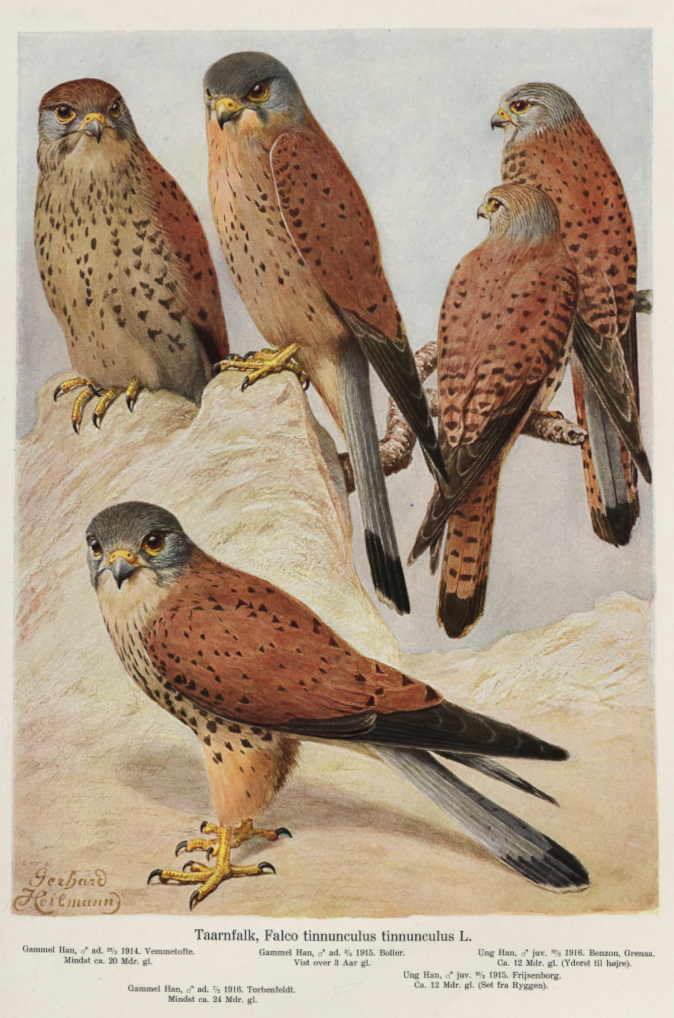
A plate showing kestrels for Danmarks Fugle (1931) by Eiler Lehn Schiøler

Heilman was born in Skelskør, Denmark where his father was a pharmacist. He joined a polytechnic at Roskilde in 1877 but moved to study medicine. While studying medicine he became inclined towards art and considered becoming a professional. Against the wishes of his family, he quit his medicine studies in 1883 and became an apprentice painter of Frans Schwartz and later P. S. Krøyer. He joined Royal Copenhagen porcelain works in 1890 and worked there until 1902. He then worked as a free-lance artist, illustrating books. Some of his key works included illustrations in Schiøler's Danmarks Fugle (birds of Denmark), Jægeren i Naturen (1925) (Hunter in Nature), Danmarks Sangfugle 1926 (Denmark's songbirds), and the three-volume Danmarks Fugleliv (1926–1930) by A. L. V. Manniche. An ardent birdwatcher himself, he was one of the first members of the Danish Ornithological Society started in 1906. He designed the front cover of the society's journal. Some Danish banknotes were designed by him.

His major work was however published as a series of short notes in Danish published in the journal Dansk Ornitologisk Forenings Tidsskrift between 1913 and 1916 and titled Vor nuværende Viden om Fuglenes Afstamning (Our present knowledge about the origin of birds). In 1926, he enlarged this and published it as an English book "The Origin of Birds". This was acclaimed for its bold ideas, depth of research and excellent illustration. He was largely self-taught and essentially an amateur, he was largely disregarded locally by established academics. He however was not afraid of taking on the establishment and made his arguments clear. Heilman was considered a quarrelsome personality. He was brought up in a conservative religious family. In later life he rebelled against religion and in 1940 he wrote a book on Darwinism and devoted the last section to arguing against religious ideas (Univers og traditionen). This included a large section pointing out how angels could not have wings since they did not have the right chest musculature. Except for this part of the book, it was overall well received.

In 1942 he changed the spelling of his name from Heilmann to "Heilman", however the older spelling predominates in literature.

== The Origin of Birds ==
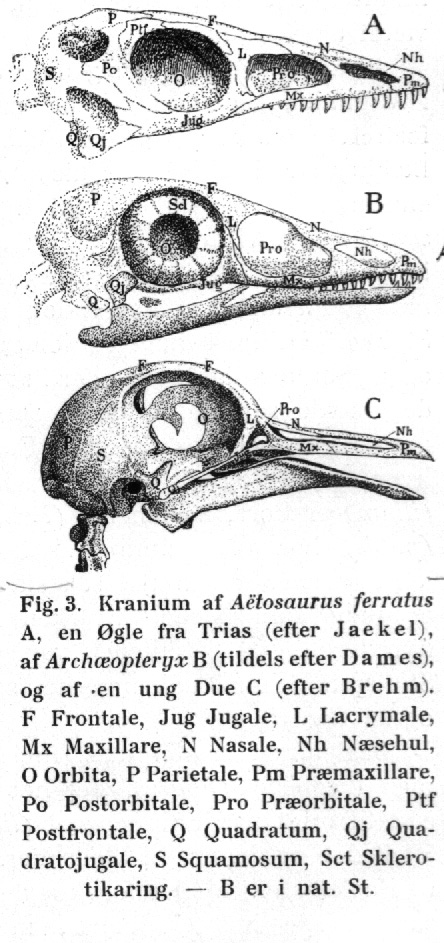
Heilman's comparison between the skulls of Aetosaurus, Archaeopteryx and a pigeon

Heilman published an English revision of his series of Danish papers in 1926 as The Origin of Birds. Like Thomas Huxley, Heilman compared Archaeopteryx and other birds to an exhaustive list of prehistoric reptiles, and also came to the conclusion that theropod dinosaurs like Compsognathus were the most similar. However, Heilman noted that birds possessed clavicles fused to form a bone called the furcula ('wishbone'), and while clavicles were known in more primitive reptiles, they had not yet been recognized in theropod dinosaurs. A firm believer in Dollo's Law, which states that evolution is not reversible, Heilman could not accept that clavicles were lost in dinosaurs and re-evolved in birds, so he was forced to rule out dinosaurs as bird ancestors and ascribe all of their similarities to convergence. Heilman stated that bird ancestors would instead be found among the more primitive 'thecodont' grade of reptiles. Heilman's extremely thorough approach ensured that his book became a classic in the field and its conclusions on bird origins, as with most other topics, were accepted by nearly all evolutionary biologists for the next four decades, despite the discovery of clavicles in the primitive theropod Segisaurus in 1936. Clavicles and even fully developed furculae have since been identified in numerous other non-avian dinosaurs.

In 1912 he contacted Adolf Herluf Winge at the Zoological Museum in Copenhagen. Winge had initially shown some interest in his work but was not particularly helpful. Winge's short responses to an eight-page letter of queries and ideas caused much irritation and Heilman decided to stop writing to him. Heilman later noted that Winge was a Lamarckist, and from that point he worked alone without communication with Danish academics. He sent a short paper in Danish in 1912 and this was accepted by the editor Otto Helms. Helms was attacked by numerous Danish academics for allowing it to be published. A letter from the Danish zoologist R. H. Stamm to Helms read: May I offer my condolences as to the latest issue? It must have been rough on you – who must know birds well, and as a medical doctor must possess some general sense of natural history – to include in the journal the dilettantish mess which occupies most of the issue. His first paper published in the Danish ornithology journal was however discovered by American paleontologist R. W. Shufeldt, who was able to make sense of it thanks to help from his Norwegian wife. This opened up Heilman to connections outside Denmark. His work was introduced to D'Arcy Thompson by R. W. Shufeldt and this led to the two exchanging ideas on morphological evolution. His past bitter encounters with Danish academics led to Heilman initially writing "I wonder why Dr. R.W. Shufeldt has written to you about my work; he ought to have told you, that I am an artist and only an incipient amateur in science. This is my first work in this line." In the course of his interactions with Thompson, he also contributed some illustrations for use in "On Growth and Form".

In 1940, Heilmann published a second book on Darwinian evolution, the Univers og traditionen (Universe and Tradition, in Danish). He also expressed his sentiments against religious beliefs in this book. The bird-like dinosaur species Scansoriopteryx heilmanni was named in honour of Gerhard Heilman in 2002.
