= Evan Lindquist =

American artist and printmaker (1936–2023)

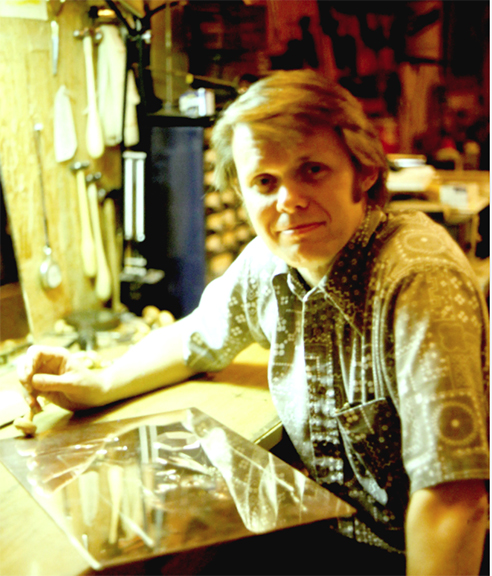
- Evan Lindquist, 1976, engraving a copper plate
- Born: May 23, 1936; Salina, Kansas, U.S.
- Died: December 18, 2023 (aged 87); Jonesboro, Arkansas, U.S.
- Education: University of Iowa, MFA; Emporia State University.
- Known for: Printmaking, copperplate engraving
- Awards: Arkansas Artist Laureate 2013-2017
- Website: www.evanlindquist.com

Evan Lindquist (May 23, 1936 – December 18, 2023) was an American artist and printmaker who was appointed to be the first Artist Laureate for the State of Arkansas. He concentrated on the medium of copperplate engraving for more than 50 years. His compositions are memorable for their emphasis on calligraphic lines.

== Biography and education ==
Evan Lindquist was born in Salina, Kansas. His father was a lumber retailer in nearby Solomon, Kansas. In 1938, the family moved to Odessa, Missouri. In 1945, the family moved to Emporia, Kansas, where he was enrolled in the Laboratory Training School on the campus of Emporia State University.

At the age of 14, Lindquist started his own business, working as a professional calligrapher, engrosser, and gold-leaf artist. His clientele grew, and by 1952 his work was national in scope, including hand-lettered fraternity charters and certificates of membership for Alpha Kappa Lambda fraternity. In 1954, he graduated from Emporia High School and enrolled as a freshman at Emporia State University. He was employed as a Biology Lab Teaching Assistant, and later, he served as Staff Artist in the Graphic Arts and Printing Departments. A legendary aunt, Christina Lillian, had inspired Lindquist to become an artist himself.

In 1958, Lindquist earned the B.S. degree at Emporia State University, and he married artist Sharon Huenergardt. They have two sons. He continued working for ESU as Staff Artist until 1960 when Evan and Sharon moved to Iowa City, Iowa. From 1960 to 1963, he studied printmaking with Prof. Mauricio Lasansky at the University of Iowa, earning the M.F.A. degree in printmaking.

In 1963, he began teaching in the Art Department at Arkansas State University in Jonesboro, until he retired from teaching in 2003. In 1981, he was awarded the honor of Outstanding Faculty Member and appointed by ASU President Ray Thornton to be First Chairman of The President's Fellows, a group formed to advise the president. He was awarded the rank of Emeritus Professor of Art, and he continues creating prints in his private studio in Jonesboro, Arkansas. Lindquist died on December 18, 2023, at the age of 87.

== Works ==
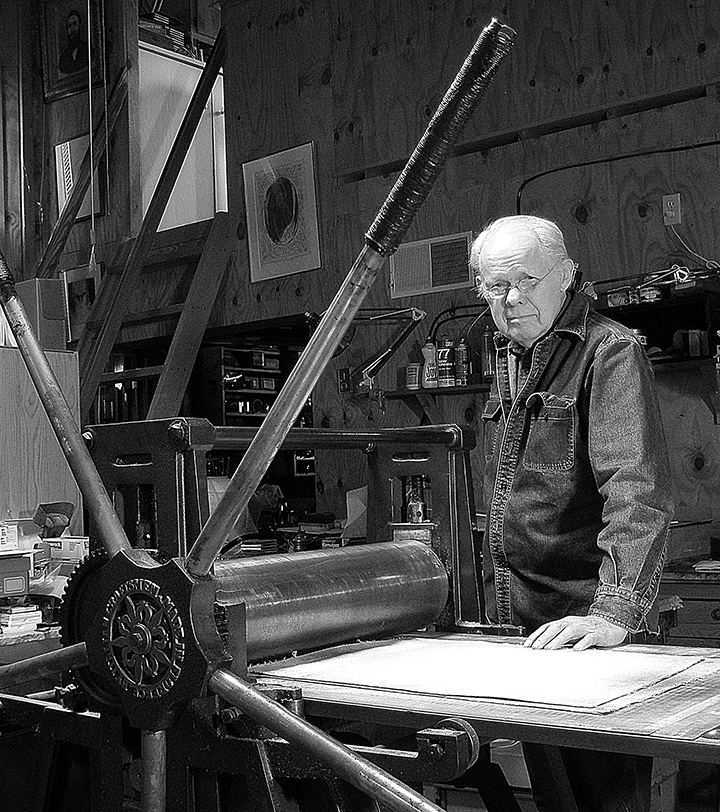
Evan Lindquist, artist-printmaker, in his studio, 2016

Lindquist has concentrated on the process of burin engraving for printmaking since 1960. His best-known works have explored the topics of string theories, Academe, old master engravers, labyrinths, and several others.

Lindquist's series on old master engravers was shown in 2015-2016 during a nine-month exhibition at Syracuse University Art Galleries, Syracuse, NY.

== Selected Museum Collections ==
Some public collections holding Lindquist prints:

- Albertina, Vienna, Austria
- Arkansas Arts Center, Little Rock, AR
- Art Complex Museum, Duxbury, Massachusetts
- Art Institute of Chicago, Chicago, IL
- Baltimore Museum of Art, Baltimore, MD
- Blanton Museum of Art, The University of Texas at Austin
- Boston Museum of Fine Arts, Boston, MA
- Columbia University Libraries, New York, NY
- DeCordova Museum, Lincoln, MA
- Dublin City Gallery The Hugh Lane, Dublin, Ireland
- Fresno Metropolitan Museum of Art and Science, Fresno, CA
- Herbert F. Johnson Museum of Art, Cornell University, Ithaca, NY
- Joslyn Art Museum, Omaha, NE
- Kenosha Public Museum, Kenosha, WI
- Lauren Rogers Museum of Art, Laurel, MS
- Memphis Brooks Museum of Art, Memphis, TN
- Miami-Dade Public Library System, Miami, FL
- Mississippi Museum of Art, Jackson, MS
- Museo Nacional Centro de Arte Reina Sofía, Madrid, Spain
- Nelson-Atkins Museum of Art, Kansas City, MO
- New Jersey State Museum, Trenton, NJ
- New Orleans Museum of Art, New Orleans, LA
- Portland Art Museum, Portland, OR
- Fine Arts Museums of San Francisco, San Francisco, CA
- Spencer Museum of Art, Lawrence, KS
- Springfield Art Museum, Springfield, MO
- Syracuse University Art Galleries, Syracuse, NY
- Museum of Art and Archaeology, University of Missouri, Columbia, MO
- Uffizi, Florence, Italy
- Whitney Museum of American Art, NY
- Bradbury Art Museum, Jonesboro, AR

== Honors ==
- 2013: Appointed as the first Artist Laureate for the State of Arkansas, 2013-2017
- 2010: Lifetime Achievement Award, conferred by The Society of American Graphic Artists (SAGA)
- 2010: Centennial list of 100 Most Distinguished Faculty Members at Arkansas State University from 1909 to 2009
- 2009: Profiled, 100 Years 100 Voices, 1909-2009. Arkansas State University.
- 2004: Governor's Lifetime Achievement Award conferred by the Arkansas Arts Council
- 2004: Distinguished Alumni Award, Emporia State University,
- 1981: Outstanding Faculty Member, awarded by Arkansas State University
- 1981: First Chairman of the President's Fellows, awarded by Arkansas State University
