= Origin of birds =

Central question in evolutionary biology of birds

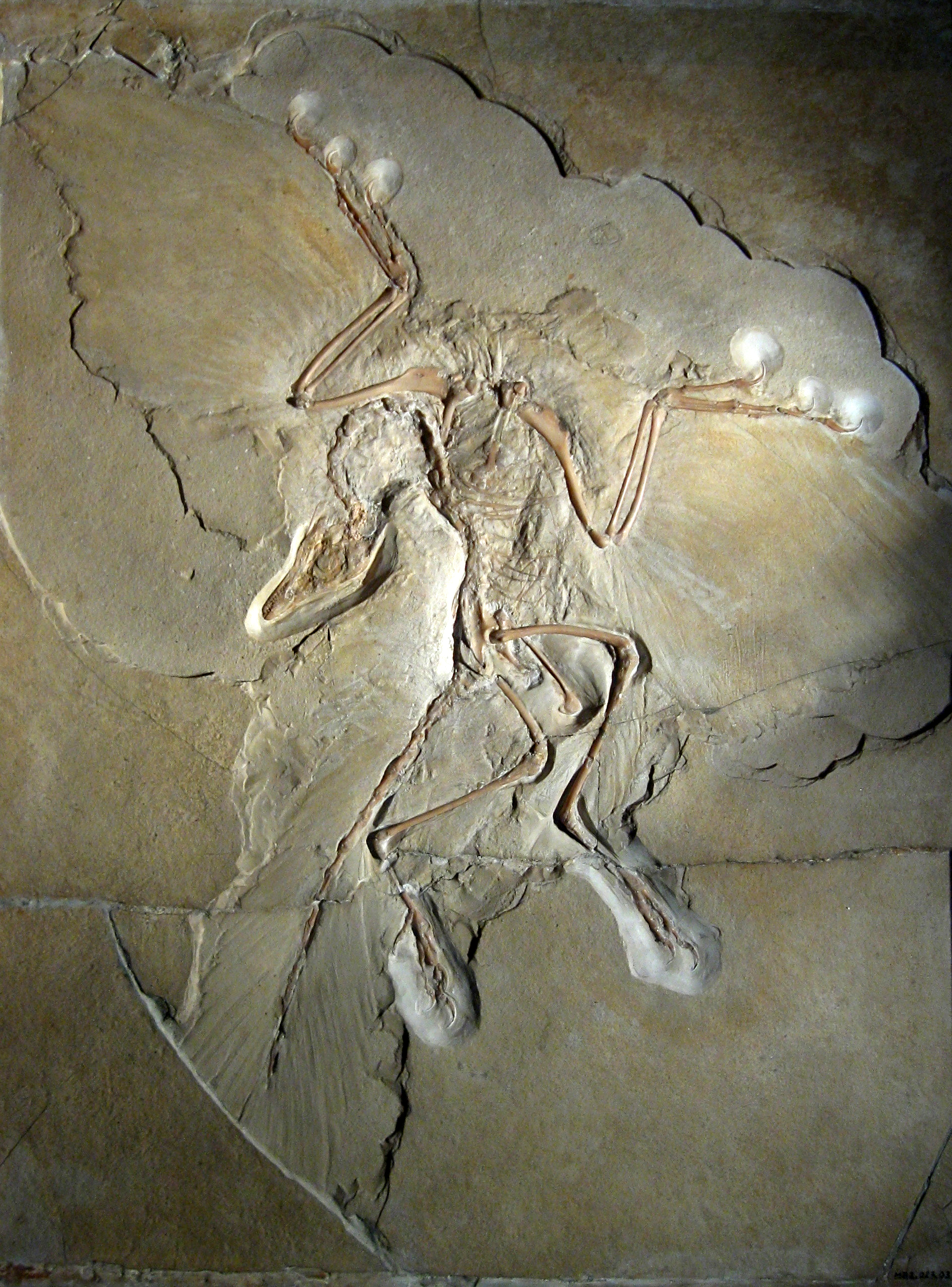
The Berlin specimen of Archaeopteryx lithographica

The scientific question of which larger group of animals birds evolved within has traditionally been called the "origin of birds". The present scientific consensus is that birds are a group of maniraptoran theropod dinosaurs that originated during the Mesozoic era.

A close relationship between birds and dinosaurs was first proposed in the nineteenth century after the discovery of the primitive bird Archaeopteryx in Germany. Birds and extinct non-avian dinosaurs share many unique skeletal traits. Moreover, fossils of more than thirty species of non-avian dinosaur with preserved feathers have been collected. There are even very small dinosaurs, such as Microraptor and Anchiornis, which have long, vaned arm and leg feathers forming wings. The Jurassic basal avialan Pedopenna also shows these long foot feathers. Paleontologist Lawrence Witmer concluded in 2009 that this evidence is sufficient to demonstrate that avian evolution went through a four-winged stage. Fossil evidence also demonstrates that birds and dinosaurs shared features such as hollow, pneumatized bones, gastroliths in the digestive system, nest-building, and brooding behaviors.

Although the origin of birds has historically been a contentious topic within evolutionary biology, only a few scientists still dispute the dinosaurian origin of birds, suggesting descent from other types of archosaurian reptiles. Within the consensus that supports dinosaurian ancestry, the exact sequence of evolutionary events that gave rise to the early birds within maniraptoran theropods is disputed. The origin of bird flight is a separate but related question for which there are also several proposed answers.

== Research history ==
=== Huxley, Archaeopteryx and early research ===
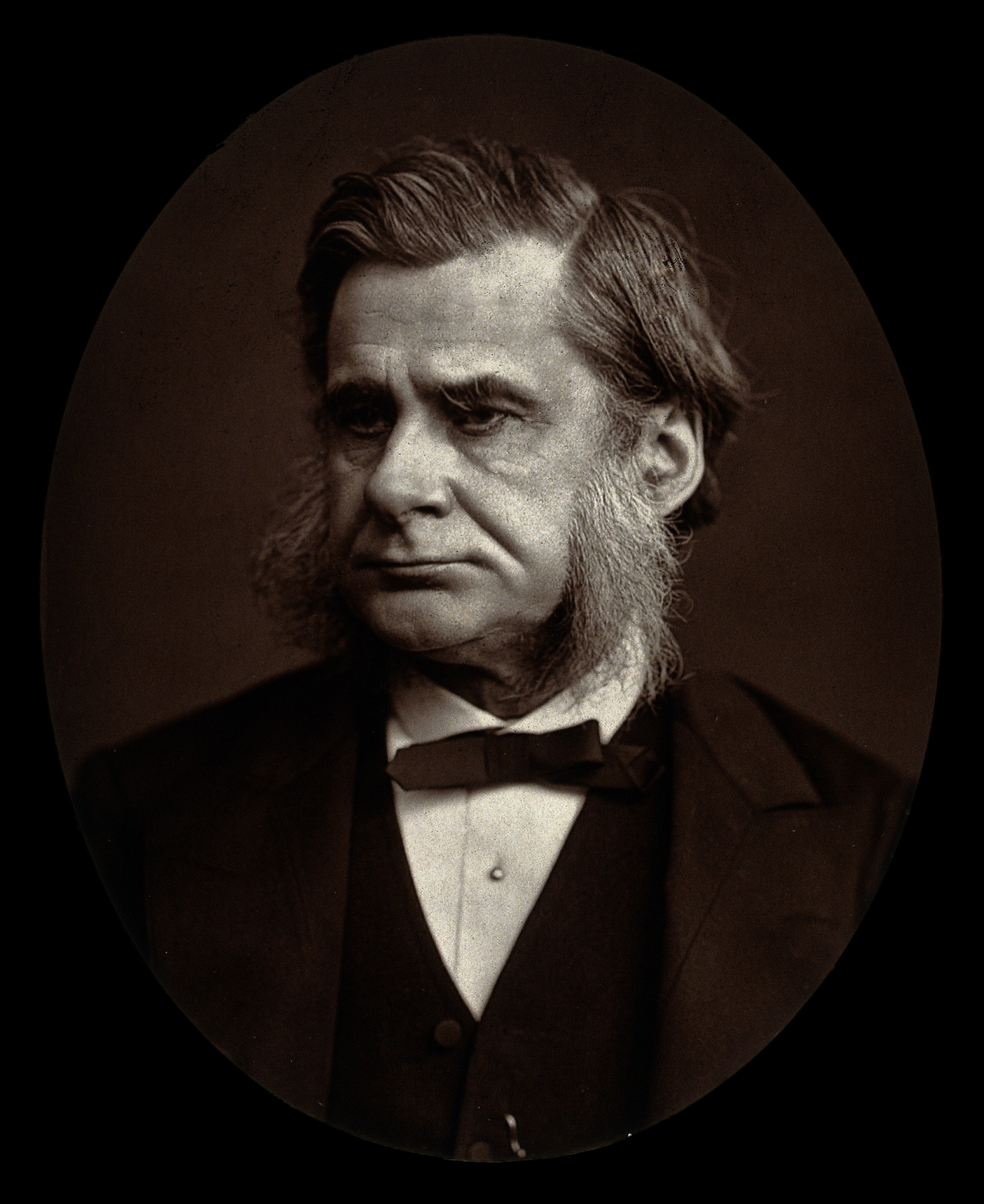
Thomas Henry Huxley (1825–1895)

Scientific investigation into the origin of birds began shortly after the 1859 publication of Charles Darwin's On the Origin of Species. In 1860, a fossilized feather was discovered in Germany's Late Jurassic Solnhofen limestone. Christian Erich Hermann von Meyer described this feather as Archaeopteryx lithographica the next year. Richard Owen described a nearly complete skeleton in 1863, recognizing it as a bird despite many features reminiscent of reptiles, including clawed forelimbs and a long, bony tail.

Biologist Thomas Henry Huxley, known as "Darwin's Bulldog" for his tenacious support of the new theory of evolution by means of natural selection, almost immediately seized upon Archaeopteryx as a transitional fossil between birds and reptiles. Starting in 1868, and following earlier suggestions by Carl Gegenbaur, and Edward Drinker Cope, Huxley made detailed comparisons of Archaeopteryx with various prehistoric reptiles and found that it was most similar to dinosaurs like Hypsilophodon and Compsognathus. The discovery in the late 1870s of the iconic "Berlin specimen" of Archaeopteryx, complete with a set of reptilian teeth, provided further evidence. Like Cope, Huxley proposed an evolutionary relationship between birds and dinosaurs. Although Huxley was opposed by the very influential Owen, his conclusions were accepted by many biologists, including Baron Franz Nopcsa, while others, notably Harry Seeley, argued that the similarities were due to convergent evolution.

=== Heilmann and the thecodont hypothesis ===
A turning point came in the early twentieth century with the writings of Gerhard Heilmann of Denmark. An artist by trade, Heilmann had a scholarly interest in birds and from 1913 to 1916, expanding on earlier work by Othenio Abel, published the results of his research in several parts, dealing with the anatomy, embryology, behavior, paleontology, and evolution of birds. His work, originally written in Danish as Vor Nuvaerende Viden om Fuglenes Afstamning, was compiled, translated into English, and published in 1926 as The Origin of Birds.

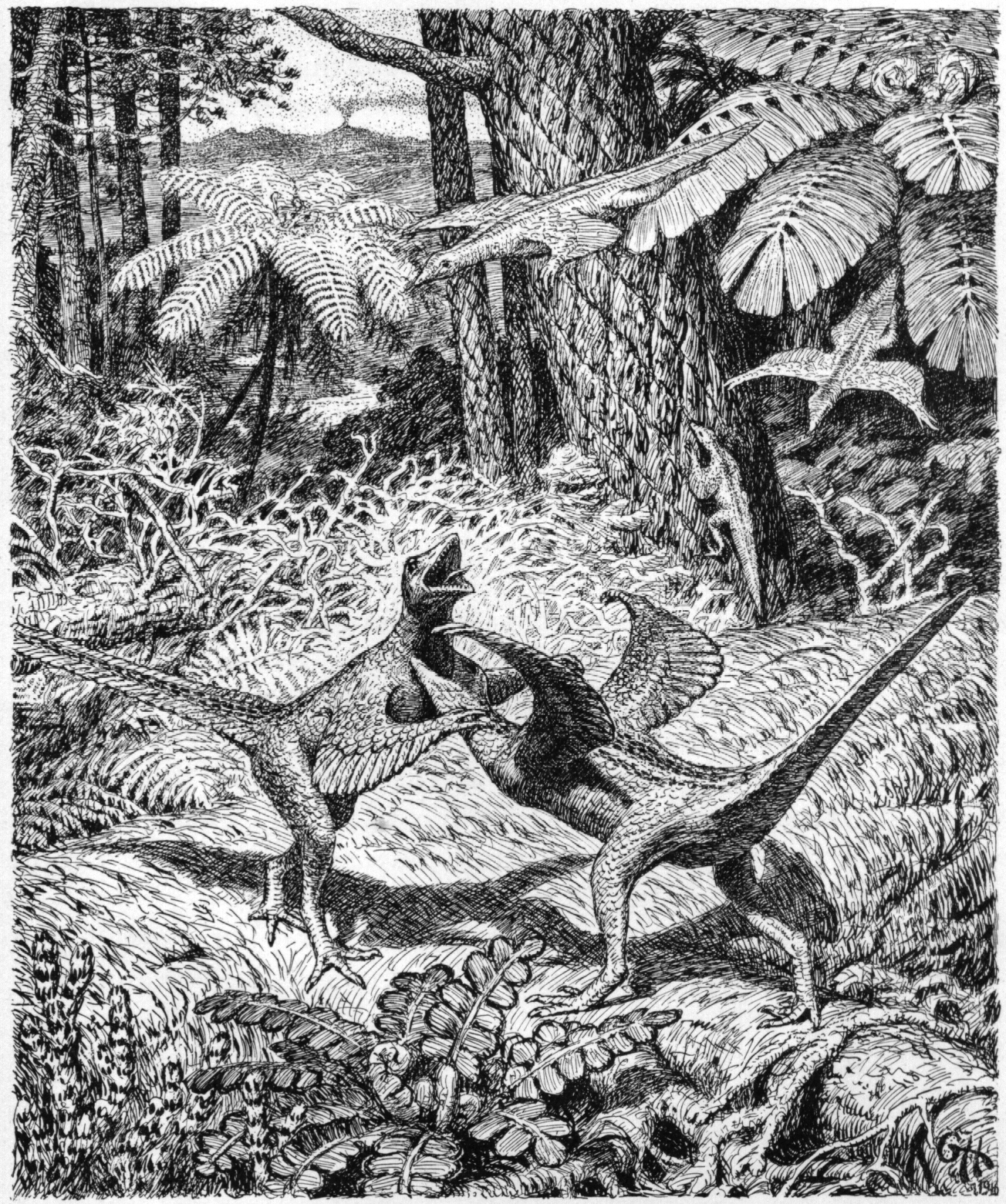
Heilmann's hypothetical illustration of a pair of fighting 'Proaves' from 1916

Like Huxley, Heilmann compared Archaeopteryx and other birds to an exhaustive list of prehistoric reptiles, and also came to the conclusion that theropod dinosaurs like Compsognathus were the most similar. However, Heilmann noted that birds had clavicles (collar bones) fused to form a bone called the furcula ("wishbone"), and while clavicles were known in more primitive reptiles, they had not yet been recognized in dinosaurs. Since he was a firm believer in an interpretation of Dollo's law that stated that evolution was not "reversible", Heilmann could not accept that clavicles were lost in dinosaurs and re-evolved in birds. He was therefore forced to rule out dinosaurs as bird ancestors and ascribe all of their similarities to convergent evolution. Heilmann stated that bird ancestors would instead be found among the more primitive "thecodont" grade of reptiles. Heilmann's extremely thorough approach ensured that his book became a classic in the field, and its conclusions on bird origins, as with most other topics, were accepted by nearly all evolutionary biologists for the next four decades.

Clavicles are relatively delicate bones and therefore in danger of being destroyed or at least damaged beyond recognition. Nevertheless, some fossil theropod clavicles had actually been excavated before Heilmann wrote his book, but these had been misidentified. The absence of clavicles in dinosaurs became the orthodox view despite the discovery of clavicles in the primitive theropod Segisaurus in 1936. The next report of clavicles in a dinosaur was in a Russian article in 1983, where Mongolian paleontologist Rinchen Barsbold argued that one or several lineages of theropods may have evolved into birds.

Contrary to what Heilmann believed, paleontologists now accept that clavicles and, in most cases, furculae are a standard feature not just of theropods but of saurischian dinosaurs. Up to late 2007 ossified furculae (i.e. made of bone rather than cartilage) have been found in all types of theropods except the most basal ones, Eoraptor and Herrerasaurus. The original report of a furcula in the primitive theropod Segisaurus (1936) was confirmed by a re-examination in 2005. Joined, furcula-like clavicles have also been found in Massospondylus, an Early Jurassic sauropodomorph.

=== Ostrom, Deinonychus, and the dinosaur renaissance ===
The similarity of the forelimbs of Deinonychus (left) and Archaeopteryx (right) led John Ostrom to revive the link between dinosaurs and birds.

The 'thecodont' hypothesis began to fall out of favor after the 1964 discovery of a new theropod dinosaur in Montana. In 1969, this dinosaur was described and named Deinonychus by John Ostrom of Yale University. The next year, Ostrom redescribed a specimen of Pterodactylus in the Dutch Teylers Museum as another skeleton of Archaeopteryx. The specimen consisted mainly of a single wing and its description made Ostrom aware of the similarities between the wrists of Archaeopteryx and Deinonychus.

In 1972, British paleontologist Alick Walker hypothesized that birds arose not from 'thecodonts' but from crocodile ancestors like Sphenosuchus. Ostrom's work with both theropods and early birds led him to respond with a series of publications in the mid-1970s in which he laid out the many similarities between birds and theropod dinosaurs, resurrecting the ideas first put forth by Huxley over a century before. Ostrom's recognition of the dinosaurian ancestry of birds, along with other new ideas about dinosaur metabolism, activity levels, and parental care, began what is known as the dinosaur renaissance, which began in the 1960s and, according to some, continues to this day.

Ostrom's revelations also coincided with the increasing adoption of phylogenetic systematics (cladistics), which began in the 1960s with the work of Willi Hennig. Cladistics is an exact method of arranging species based strictly on their evolutionary relationships, which are calculated by determining the evolutionary tree implying the least number of changes in their anatomical characteristics. In the 1980s, cladistic methodology was applied to dinosaur phylogeny for the first time by Jacques Gauthier and others, showing unequivocally that birds were a derived group of theropod dinosaurs. Early analyses suggested that dromaeosaurid theropods like Deinonychus were particularly closely related to birds, a result that has been corroborated many times since.

=== Feathered dinosaurs in China ===
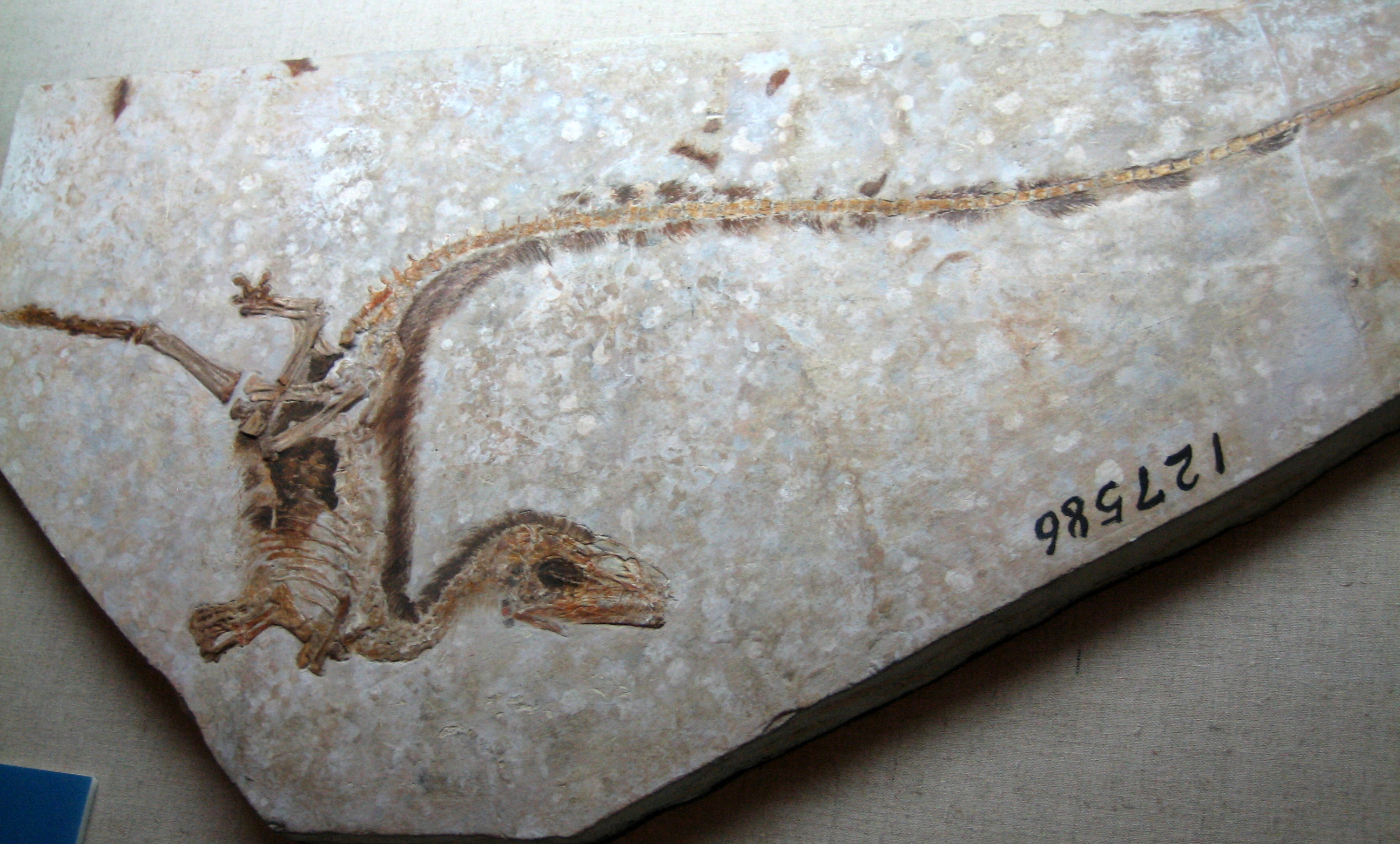
Fossil of Sinosauropteryx prima

The early 1990s saw the discovery of spectacularly preserved bird fossils in several Early Cretaceous geological formations in the northeastern Chinese province of Liaoning. In 1996, Chinese paleontologists described Sinosauropteryx as a new genus of bird from the Yixian Formation, but this animal was quickly recognized as a more basal theropod dinosaur closely related to Compsognathus. Surprisingly, its body was covered by long filamentous structures. These were dubbed 'protofeathers' and considered homologous with the more advanced feathers of birds, although some scientists disagree with this assessment. Chinese and North American scientists described Caudipteryx and Protarchaeopteryx soon after. Based on skeletal features, these animals were non-avian dinosaurs, but their remains bore fully formed feathers closely resembling those of birds. "Archaeoraptor", described without peer review in a 1999 issue of National Geographic, turned out to be a smuggled forgery, but authentic remains continue to pour out of the Yixian, both legally and illegally. Feathers or "protofeathers" have been found on a wide variety of theropods in the Yixian. The morphological gap between non-avian theropods and birds is further closed by the discoveries of extremely bird-like non-avian dinosaurs, as well as non-avian dinosaur-like basal birds.

=== Digit homology ===
There is a debate between embryologists and paleontologists whether the hands of theropod dinosaurs and birds are essentially different, based on phalangeal counts—a count of the number of phalanges (finger bones) in the hand.

Embryologists and some paleontologists who oppose the bird-dinosaur link have long numbered the digits of birds II-III-IV based on multiple studies of the development in the egg. This is based on the fact that in most amniotes, the first digit to form in a 5-fingered hand is digit IV, which develops a primary axis. Therefore, embryologists have identified the primary axis in birds as digit IV, and the surviving digits as II-III-IV. The fossils of advanced theropod (Tetanurae) hands appear to have the digits I-II-III (some genera within Avetheropoda also have a reduced digit IV). If this is true, then the II-III-IV development of digits in birds is an indication against theropod (dinosaur) ancestry. However, with no ontogenical (developmental) basis to definitively state which digits are which on a theropod hand (because no non-avian theropods can be observed growing and developing today), the labelling of the theropod hand is not conclusive.

Paleontologists have traditionally identified avian digits as I-II-III. They argue that the digits of birds' number I-II-III, just as those of theropod dinosaurs do, by the conserved phalangeal formula. The phalangeal count for archosaurs is 2-3-4-5-3; many archosaur lineages have a reduced number of digits, but have the same phalangeal formula in the digits that remain. In other words, paleontologists assert that archosaurs of different lineages tend to lose the same digits when digit loss occurs, from the outside to the inside. The three digits of dromaeosaurs and Archaeopteryx have the same phalangeal formula of I-II-III as digits I-II-III of basal archosaurs. Therefore, the lost digits would be V and IV. If this is true, then modern birds would also possess digits I-II-III. Also, one 1999 publication proposed a frame-shift in the digits of the theropod line leading to birds (thus making digit I into digit II, II to III, and so forth). However, such frame shifts are rare in amniotes and—to be consistent with the theropod origin of birds—would have had to occur solely in the bird-theropod lineage forelimbs and not the hindlimbs (a condition unknown in any animal). This is called Lateral Digit Reduction (LDR) versus Bilateral Digit Reduction (BDR) (see also Limusaurus).

A small minority, known by the acronym BAND (Birds Are Not Dinosaurs), including ornithologists Alan Feduccia and Larry Martin, continues to assert that birds are more closely related to earlier reptiles, such as Longisquama or Euparkeria, than to dinosaurs. Embryological studies of bird developmental biology have raised questions about digit homology in bird and dinosaur forelimbs. However, due to the cogent evidence provided by comparative anatomy and phylogenetics, and the feathered dinosaur fossils from China, the idea that birds are derived dinosaurs remains widely supported among paleontologists.

An alternative to the frame-shift hypothesis is the axis-shift. According to this explanation, the primary limb axis in birds runs through digit III instead of IV. This idea is supported by palaeontological observations, which determine the phalangeal formula 2-3-4-1-X for the last common ancestor of ceratosaurs (including Limusaurus) and tetanurans (including the tridactyl forms with the phalangeal formula 2-3-4-X-X).

Some later embryological data support the identification of bird digits as I, II, III (as in their theropod ancestors) due to the posterior finger's development outside the shh-expressing zone of polarizing activity.

=== Thermogenic muscle hypothesis ===
A 2011 publication suggested that selection for the expansion of skeletal muscle, rather than the evolution of flight, was the driving force for the emergence of this clade. Muscles became larger in prospectively endothermic saurians, according to this hypothesis, as a response to the loss of the vertebrate mitochondrial uncoupling protein, UCP1. In mammals, UCP1 functions within brown adipose tissue, which is thermogenic to protect newborns against hypothermia. In modern birds, skeletal muscle serves a similar function and is presumed to have done so in their ancestors. In this view, bipedality and other avian skeletal alterations were side effects of muscle hyperplasia, with further evolutionary modifications of the forelimbs, including adaptations for flight or swimming, and vestigiality, being secondary consequences of two-leggedness.

== Phylogeny ==
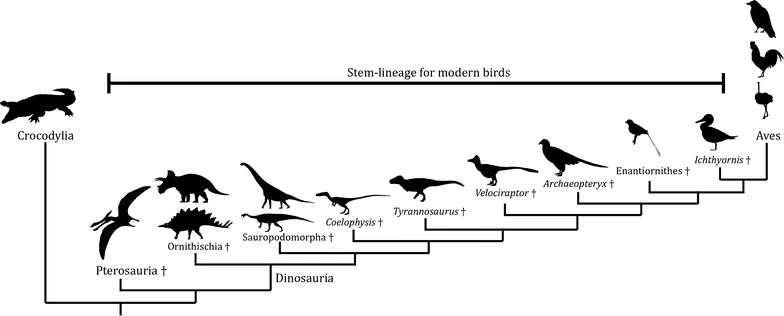
Simplified phylogenetic tree showing the relationship between modern birds and other dinosaurs

Archaeopteryx has historically been considered the first bird, or Urvogel. Although newer fossil discoveries filled the gap between theropods and Archaeopteryx, as well as the gap between Archaeopteryx and modern birds, phylogenetic taxonomists, in keeping with tradition, almost always use Archaeopteryx as a specifier to help define Aves. Aves has more rarely been defined as a crown group consisting only of modern birds. Nearly all palaeontologists regard birds as coelurosaurian theropod dinosaurs. Within Coelurosauria, multiple cladistic analyses have found support for a clade named Maniraptora, consisting of therizinosauroids, oviraptorosaurs, troodontids, dromaeosaurids, and birds. Of these, dromaeosaurids and troodontids are usually united in the clade Deinonychosauria, which is a sister group to birds (together forming the node-clade Eumaniraptora) within the stem-clade Paraves.

Other studies have proposed alternative phylogenies, in which certain groups of dinosaurs usually considered non-avian may have evolved from avian ancestors. For example, a 2002 analysis found that oviraptorosaurs were basal avians. Alvarezsaurids, known from Asia and the Americas, have been variously classified as basal maniraptorans, paravians, the sister taxon of ornithomimosaurs, as well as specialized early birds. The genus Rahonavis, originally described as an early bird, has been identified as a non-avian dromaeosaurid in several studies. Dromaeosaurids and troodontids themselves have also been suggested to lie within Aves rather than just outside it.

== Features linking birds and dinosaurs ==
Many anatomical features are shared by birds and other theropod dinosaurs.

=== Feathers ===
Archaeopteryx, the first good example of a "feathered dinosaur", was discovered in 1861. The first specimen was found in the Solnhofen limestone in southern Germany, which is a lagerstätte, a rare and remarkable geological formation known for its superbly detailed fossils. Archaeopteryx is a transitional fossil, with features clearly intermediate between those of non-avian theropod dinosaurs and birds. Discovered just two years after Darwin's seminal Origin of Species, its discovery spurred the nascent debate between proponents of evolutionary biology and creationism. This early bird is so dinosaur-like that, without a clear impression of feathers in the surrounding rock, at least one specimen was mistaken for Compsognathus.

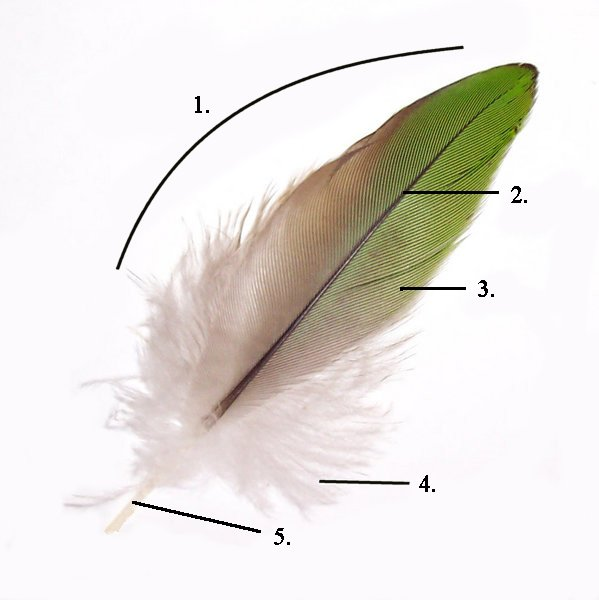
1. Blank out numbers in image
Parts of a feather

Since the 1990s, a number of additional feathered dinosaurs have been found, providing even stronger evidence of the close relationship between dinosaurs and modern birds. The first of these were initially described as simple filamentous protofeathers, which were reported in dinosaur lineages as primitive as compsognathids and tyrannosauroids. However, feathers indistinguishable from those of modern birds were soon after found in non-avialan dinosaurs as well.

A small minority of researchers have claimed that the simple filamentous "protofeather" structures are simply the result of the decomposition of collagen fiber under the dinosaurs' skin or in fins along their backs, and that species with unquestionable feathers, such as oviraptorosaurs and dromaeosaurs are not dinosaurs, but true birds unrelated to dinosaurs. However, a majority of studies have concluded that feathered dinosaurs are in fact dinosaurs, and that the simpler filaments of unquestionable theropods represent simple feathers. Some researchers have demonstrated the presence of color-bearing melanin in the structures—which would be expected in feathers but not collagen fibers. Others have demonstrated, using studies of modern bird decomposition, that even advanced feathers appear filamentous when subjected to the crushing forces experienced during fossilization, and that the supposed "protofeathers" may have been more complex than previously thought. Detailed examination of the "protofeathers" of Sinosauropteryx prima showed that individual feathers consisted of a central quill (rachis) with thinner barbs branching off from it, similar to but more primitive in structure than modern bird feathers.

The 2022 description of branched feathers in the pterosaur Tupandactylus provides strong evidence that "pycnofibers" are not actually a distinct integument unrelated to origin of feathers. The most parsimonious scenario is the presence of feathers in the last common ancestor of pterosaurs and dinosaurs already in the Early Triassic. Tupandactylus's melanosomes indicate visual signalling was an important factor in the evolution of feathers.

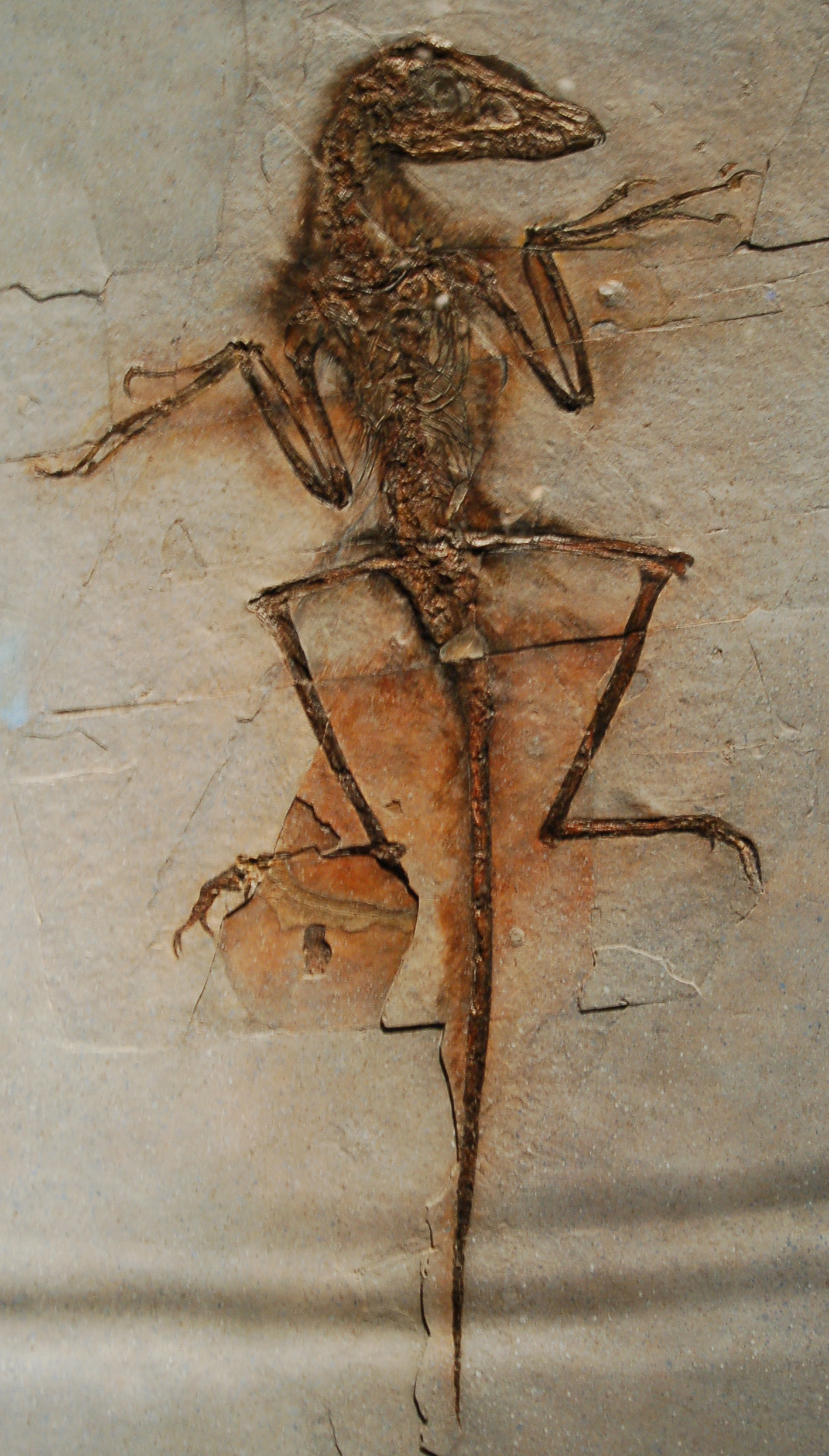
Fossil cast of NGMC 91, a probable specimen of Sinornithosaurus

=== Skeleton ===
Because feathers are often associated with birds, feathered dinosaurs are often touted as the "missing link" between birds and other dinosaurs. However, the multiple skeletal features also shared by the two groups represent the more important proof for paleontologists.

Comparisons of bird and dinosaur skeletons, as well as cladistic analysis, strengthens the case for the link, particularly for a branch of theropods called Maniraptora. Skeletal similarities include the skull, tooth build, neck, uncinate processes on the ribs, an open hip socket, a retroverted long pubis, flexible wrist (semi-lunate carpal), long arms, three-fingered hand, general pectoral girdle, shoulder blade, furcula, and breast bones. Almost all skeletal traits of Archaeopteryx can be found in non-avian maniraptorans.

A study comparing embryonic, juvenile and adult archosaur skulls concluded that bird skulls are derived from those of theropod dinosaurs by progenesis, a type of paedomorphic heterochrony, which resulted in retention of juvenile characteristics of their ancestors.

=== Lungs ===
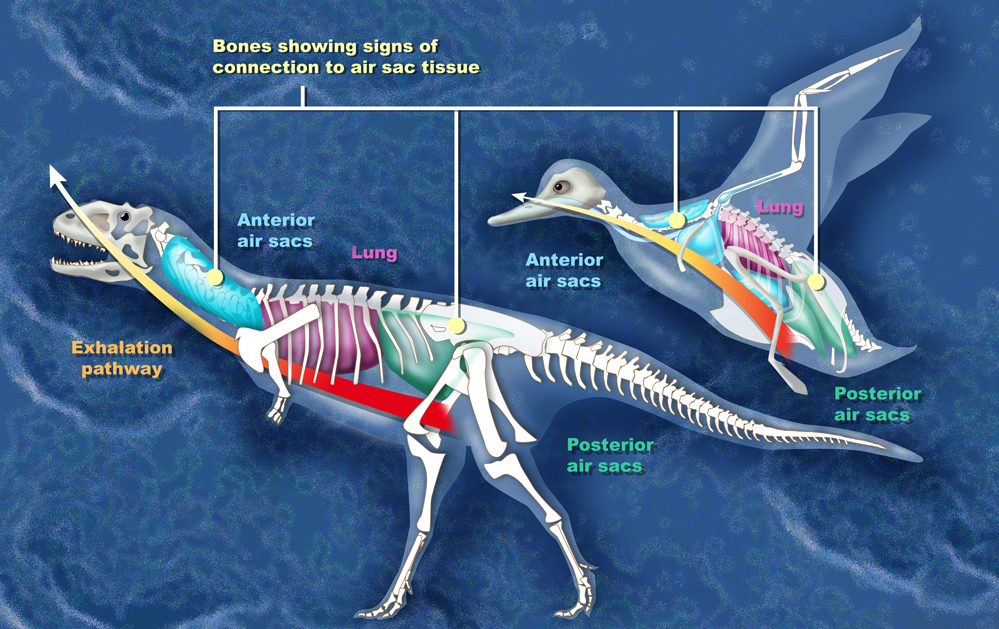
Comparison between the air sacs of Majungasaurus and a bird (duck)

Large meat-eating dinosaurs had a complex system of air sacs similar to those found in modern birds, according to an investigation led by Patrick M. O'Connor of Ohio University. In theropod dinosaurs (carnivores that walked on two legs and had birdlike feet) flexible soft tissue air sacs likely pumped air through the stiff lungs, as is the case in birds. "What was once formally considered unique to birds was present in some form in the ancestors of birds", O'Connor said.

=== Heart ===
Computed tomography (CT) scans conducted in 2000 of the chest cavity of a specimen of the ornithopod Thescelosaurus found the apparent remnants of a complex four-chambered heart, much like those found in today's mammals and birds. The idea is controversial within the scientific community, criticised for being bad anatomical science or simply wishful thinking, It is also not very surprising as crocodilians also possess four-chambered hearts.

A study published in 2011 applied multiple lines of inquiry to the question of the object's identity, including more advanced CT scanning, histology, X-ray diffraction, X-ray photoelectron spectroscopy, and scanning electron microscopy. From these methods, the authors found that: the object's internal structure does not include chambers but is made up of three unconnected areas of lower density material, and is not comparable to the structure of an ostrich's heart; the "walls" are composed of sedimentary minerals not known to be produced in biological systems, such as goethite, feldspar minerals, quartz, and gypsum, as well as some plant fragments; carbon, nitrogen, and phosphorus, chemical elements important to life, were lacking in their samples; and cardiac cellular structures were absent. There was one possible patch with animal cellular structures. The authors found their data supported identification as a concretion of sand from the burial environment, not the heart, with the possibility that isolated areas of tissues were preserved.

The question of how this find reflects metabolic rate and dinosaur internal anatomy is moot, though, regardless of the object's identity. Both modern crocodilians and birds, the closest living relatives of dinosaurs, have four-chambered hearts (albeit modified in crocodilians), so dinosaurs probably had them as well; the structure is not necessarily tied to metabolic rate.

=== Sleeping posture ===
Fossils of the troodonts Mei and Sinornithoides demonstrate that the dinosaurs slept like certain modern birds, with their heads tucked under their arms. This behavior, which may have helped to keep the head warm, is also characteristic of modern birds.

=== Reproductive biology ===
When laying eggs, female birds grow a special type of bone in their limbs. This medullary bone forms as a calcium-rich layer inside the hard outer bone, and is used as a calcium source to make eggshells. The presence of endosteally derived bone tissues lining the interior marrow cavities of portions of a Tyrannosaurus rex specimen's hind limb suggested that T. rex used similar reproductive strategies, and revealed that the specimen is female. Further research has found medullary bone in the theropod Allosaurus and ornithopod Tenontosaurus. Because the line of dinosaurs that includes Allosaurus and Tyrannosaurus diverged from the line that led to Tenontosaurus very early in the evolution of dinosaurs, this suggests that dinosaurs in general produced medullary tissue.

=== Brooding and care of young ===
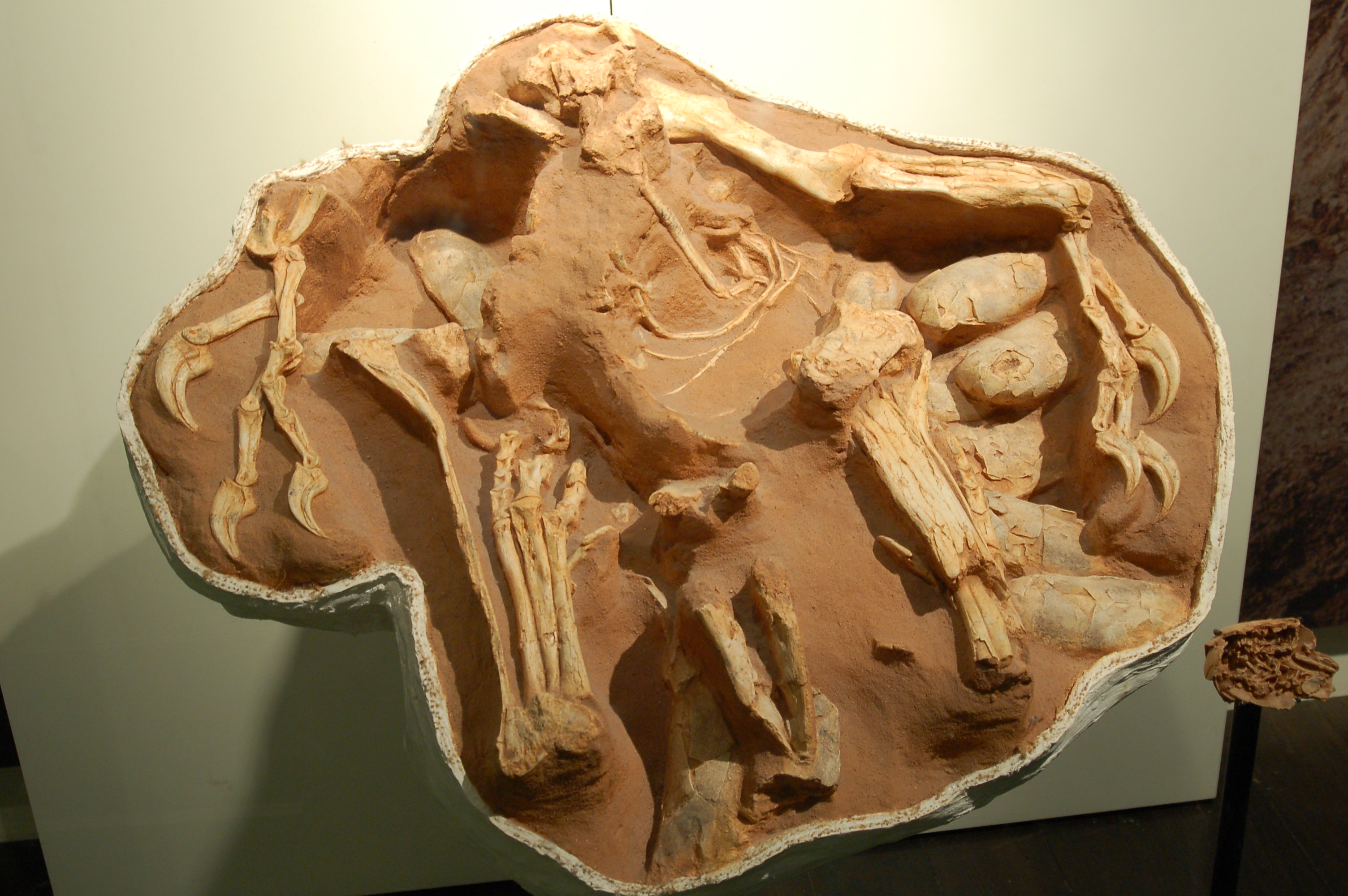
A nesting Citipati osmolskae specimen, at the American Museum of Natural History in New York City

Several Citipati specimens have been found resting over the eggs in its nest in a position most reminiscent of brooding.

Numerous dinosaur species, for example Maiasaura, have been found in herds mixing both very young and adult individuals, suggesting rich interactions between them.

A dinosaur embryo was found without teeth, which suggests some parental care was required to feed the young dinosaur, possibly the adult dinosaur regurgitated food into the young dinosaur's mouth (see altricial). This behaviour is seen in numerous bird species; parent birds regurgitate food into the hatchling's mouth.

=== Gizzard stones ===
Both birds and dinosaurs use gizzard stones. These stones are swallowed by animals to aid digestion and break down food and hard fibres once they enter the stomach. When found in association with fossils, gizzard stones are called gastroliths. Gizzard stones are also found in some fish (mullets, mud shad, and the gillaroo, a type of trout) and in crocodiles.

=== Molecular evidence ===
On several occasions, the extraction of DNA and proteins from Mesozoic dinosaurs fossils has been claimed, allowing for a comparison with birds. Several proteins have putatively been detected in dinosaur fossils, including hemoglobin. In 2023, beta-protein structures were reported from the feathers of the dinosaur Sinornithosaurus and the early bird Confuciusornis. This confirms that ancient feathers had a composition similar to that of modern birds. Some fossil feathers were reported to have a composition rich in alpha proteins, but fossilization experiments demonstrate that this protein composition is simply an artefact of preservation, because beta-sheet protein structures are readily transformed to alpha-helices during thermal maturation.

In the March 2005 issue of Science, Dr. Mary Higby Schweitzer and her team announced the discovery of flexible material resembling actual soft tissue inside a 68-million-year-old Tyrannosaurus rex leg bone of specimen MOR 1125 from the Hell Creek Formation in Montana. The seven collagen types obtained from the bone fragments, compared to collagen data from living birds (specifically, a chicken), suggest that older theropods and birds are closely related. The soft tissue allowed a molecular comparison of cellular anatomy and protein sequencing of collagen tissue published in 2007, both of which indicated that T. rex and birds are more closely related to each other than either is to Alligator. A second molecular study robustly supported the relationship of birds to dinosaurs, though it did not place birds within Theropoda, as expected. This study utilized eight additional collagen sequences extracted from a femur of the "mummified" Brachylophosaurus canadensis specimen MOR 2598, a hadrosaur. However, these results have been very controversial. No other peptides of a Mesozoic age have been reported. In 2008, it was suggested that the presumed soft tissue was in fact a bacterial microfilm. In response, it was argued that these very microfilms protected the soft tissue. Another objection was that the results could have been caused by contamination. In 2015, under more controlled conditions safeguarding against contamination, the peptides were still identified. In 2017, a study found that a peptide was present in the bone of the modern ostrich that was identical to that found in the Tyrannosaurus and Brachylophosaurus specimens, highlighting the danger of a cross-contamination.

The successful extraction of ancient DNA from dinosaur fossils has been reported on two separate occasions, but upon further inspection and peer review, neither of these reports could be confirmed.

== Origin of bird flight ==
Debates about the origin of bird flight are almost as old as the idea that birds evolved from dinosaurs, which arose soon after the discovery of Archaeopteryx in 1862. Two theories have dominated most of the discussion since then: the cursorial ("from the ground up") theory proposes that birds evolved from small, fast predators that ran on the ground; the arboreal ("from the trees down") theory proposes that powered flight evolved from unpowered gliding by arboreal (tree-climbing) animals. A more recent theory, "wing-assisted incline running" (WAIR), is a variant of the cursorial theory and proposes that wings developed their aerodynamic functions as a result of the need to run quickly up very steep slopes such as trees, which would help small feathered dinosaurs escape from predators.

In March 2018, scientists reported that Archaeopteryx was likely capable of flight, but in a manner substantially different from that of modern birds.

=== Cursorial ("from the ground up") theory ===
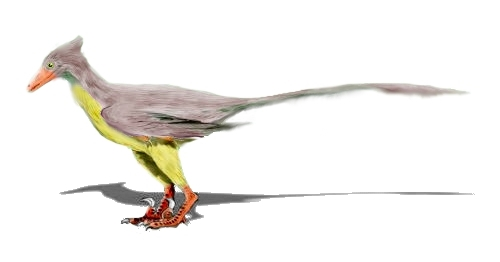
Reconstruction of Rahonavis, a ground-dwelling feathered dinosaur that some researchers think was well equipped for flight

The cursorial theory of the origin of flight was first proposed by Samuel Wendell Williston, and elaborated upon by Baron Nopcsa. This hypothesis proposes that some fast-running animals with long tails used their arms to keep their balance while running. Modern versions of this theory differ in many details from the Williston-Nopcsa version, mainly as a result of discoveries since Nopcsa's time.

Nopcsa theorized that increasing the surface area of the outstretched arms could have helped small cursorial predators keep their balance, and that the scales of the forearms elongated, evolving into feathers. The feathers could also have been used to trap insects or other prey. Progressively, the animals leapt for longer distances, helped by their evolving wings. Nopcsa also proposed three stages in the evolution of flight. First, animals developed passive flight, in which developing wing structures served as a sort of parachute. Second, they achieved active flight by flapping the wings. He used Archaeopteryx as an example of this second stage. Finally, birds gained the ability to soar.

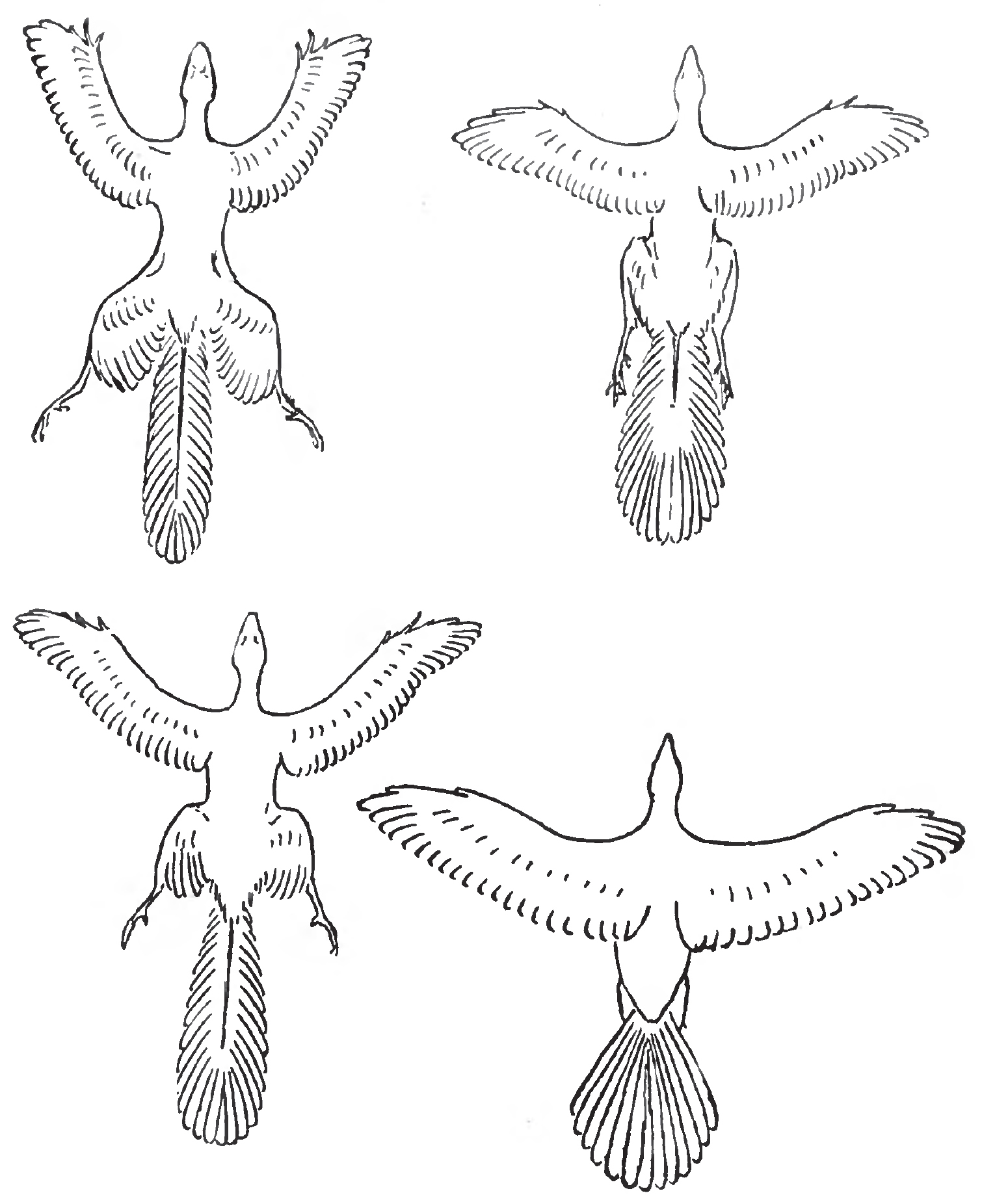
Proposed development of flight in a book from 1922: Tetrapteryx, Archaeopteryx, Hypothetical Stage, Modern Bird

While some authors had rejected the homology between feathers and scales due to their different proteins, recent studies provide evidence that those structures do share a common origin. However, Nopcsa's theory assumes that feathers evolved as part of the evolution of flight, and recent discoveries show that feathers evolved millions of years before flight.

Feathers are very common in coelurosaurian dinosaurs (including the early tyrannosauroid Dilong). Modern birds are classified as coelurosaurs by nearly all palaeontologists, though not by a few ornithologists. The modern version of the "from the ground up" hypothesis argues that birds' ancestors were small, feathered, ground-running predatory dinosaurs (rather like roadrunners in their hunting style) that used their forelimbs for balance while pursuing prey, and that the forelimbs and feathers later evolved in ways that provided gliding and then powered flight. The most widely suggested original functions of feathers include thermal insulation and competitive displays, as in modern birds.

All of the Archaeopteryx fossils come from marine sediments, and it has been suggested that wings may have helped the birds run over water in the manner of the Jesus Christ Lizard (common basilisk).

Most recent opposition to the "from the ground up" hypothesis attempt to refute the modern version's assumption that birds are modified coelurosaurian dinosaurs. The criticism is based on embryological analyses that suggest birds' wings are formed from digits 2, 3, and 4, (corresponding to the index, middle, and ring fingers in humans. The first of a bird's three digits forms the alula, which they use to avoid stalling in low-speed flight—for example, when landing). The hands of coelurosaurs, however, are formed by digits 1, 2, and 3 (thumb and first two fingers in humans). However, these embryological analyses were immediately challenged on the embryological grounds that the "hand" often develops differently in clades that have lost some digits in the course of their evolution, and that birds' "hands" do develop from digits 1, 2, and 3. For more information about this subject, see "Digit homology".

Fowler et al. (2011) proposed a model explaining how dromaeosaurids may have hunted. The animal would use its wing as stabilizers while standing on top of its prey eating it alive in the manner of an eagle or a hawk. The authors consider this an important addition to the topic of how flapping movements evolved, arguing they likely precede flight.

=== Wing-assisted incline running ===
The wing-assisted incline running (WAIR) hypothesis was prompted by observation of young chukar chicks, and proposes that wings developed their aerodynamic functions as a result of the need to run quickly up very steep slopes such as tree trunks, for example to escape from predators. This makes it a specialized type of cursorial ("from the ground up") theory. Note that in this scenario birds need downforce to give their feet increased grip. But early birds, including Archaeopteryx, lacked the shoulder mechanism by which modern birds' wings produce swift, powerful upstrokes. Since the downforce WAIR depends on is generated by upstrokes, it seems that early birds were incapable of WAIR. Because WAIR is a behavioural trait without osteological specializations, the phylogenetic placement of the flight stroke before the divergence of the Neornithes, the group which contains all extant birds, makes it impossible to determine if WAIR is ancestral to the avian flight stroke or derived from it.

=== Arboreal ("from the trees down") theory ===
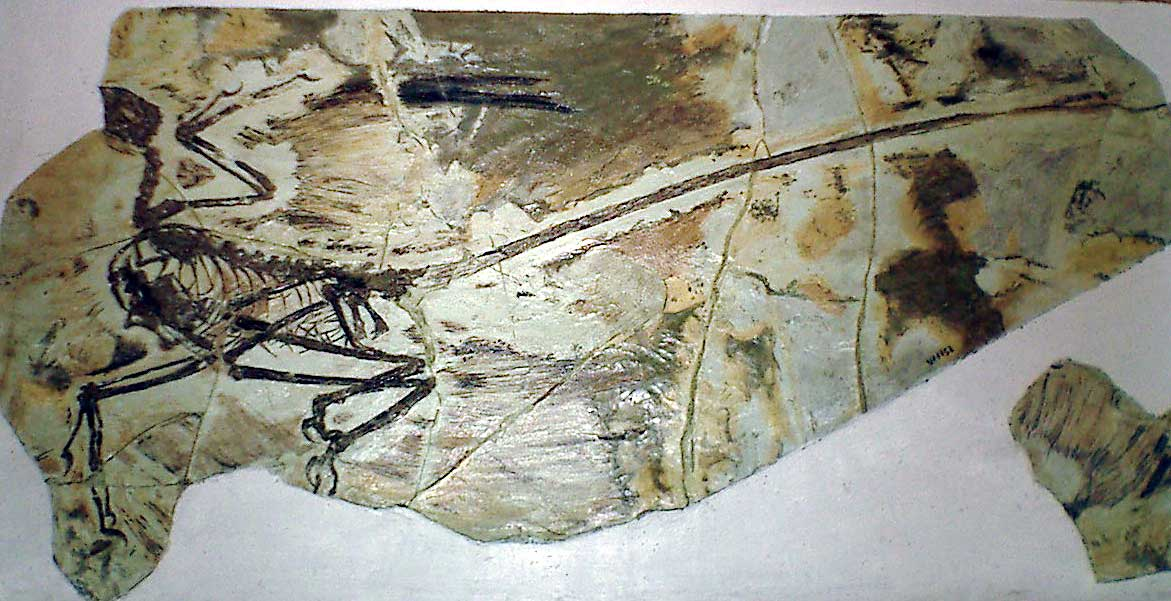
The four-winged Microraptor, a member of the Dromaeosauridae, a group of dinosaurs closely related to birds

Most versions of the arboreal hypothesis state that the ancestors of birds were very small dinosaurs that lived in trees, springing from branch to branch. This small dinosaur already had feathers, which were co-opted by evolution to produce longer, stiffer forms that were useful in aerodynamics, eventually producing wings. Wings would have then evolved and become increasingly refined as devices to give the leaper more control, to parachute, to glide, and to fly in stepwise fashion. The arboreal hypothesis also notes that, for arboreal animals, aerodynamics are far more energy efficient, since such animals simply fall to achieve minimum gliding speeds.

Several small dinosaurs from the Jurassic or Early Cretaceous, all with feathers, have been interpreted as possibly having arboreal and/or aerodynamic adaptations. These include Scansoriopteryx, Epidexipteryx, Microraptor, Pedopenna, and Anchiornis. Anchiornis is particularly important to this subject, as it lived at the beginning of the Late Jurassic, long before Archaeopteryx.

Analysis of the proportions of the toe bones of the most primitive birds Archaeopteryx and Confuciusornis, compared to those of living species, suggest that the early species may have lived both on the ground and in trees.

One study suggested that the earliest birds and their immediate ancestors did not climb trees. This study determined that the amount of toe claw curvature of early birds was more like that seen in modern ground-foraging birds than in perching birds.

=== Diminished significance of Archaeopteryx ===
Archaeopteryx was the first and for a long time the only known feathered Mesozoic animal. As a result, discussion of the evolution of birds and of bird flight centered on Archaeopteryx at least until the mid-1990s.

The supracoracoideus works using a pulley-like system to lift the wing while the pectorals provide the powerful downstroke.

There has been debate about whether Archaeopteryx could really fly. It appears that Archaeopteryx had the brain structures and inner-ear balance sensors that birds use to control their flight. Archaeopteryx also had a wing feather arrangement like that of modern birds and similarly asymmetrical flight feathers on its wings and tail. But Archaeopteryx lacked the shoulder mechanism by which modern birds' wings produce swift, powerful upstrokes (see diagram above of supracoracoideus pulley); this may mean that it and other early birds were incapable of flapping flight and could only glide.

But the discovery since the early 1990s of many feathered dinosaurs means that Archaeopteryx is no longer the key figure in the evolution of bird flight. Other small feathered coelurosaurs from the Cretaceous and Late Jurassic show possible precursors of avian flight. These include Rahonavis, a ground-runner with a Velociraptor-like raised sickle claw on the second toe, that some paleontologists assume to have been better adapted for flight than Archaeopteryx, Scansoriopteryx, an arboreal dinosaur that may support the "from the trees down" theory, and Microraptor, an arboreal dinosaur possibly capable of powered flight but, if so, more like a biplane, as it had well-developed feathers on its legs. As early as 1915, some scientists argued that the evolution of bird flight may have gone through a four-winged (or tetrapteryx) stage. Hartman et al. (2019) found that, because of how basal flying paravians are phylogenetically distributed, flight most likely evolved five times among paravians instead of only once. Yi, Archaeopteryx, Rahonavis and Microraptor were thus considered examples of convergent evolution instead of precursors of bird flight.

=== Secondary flightlessness in dinosaurs ===
- - Ornithomimosauria
  - Maniraptora
    - - Alvarezsaurids
      - Therizinosauria
    - - Protarchaeopteryx
      - - Oviraptorosauria
        - - - - flightless anchiornithids
              - **Archaeopteryx**
            - - - flightless unenlagiids
                - **Rahonavis**
              - - Troodontidae
                - - flightless dromaeosaurs
                  - **Microraptor**
          - - **Scansoriopterygidae**
            - - Zhongornis
              - - Balaur
                - **short-tailed dinosaurs**

Simplified cladogram from Hartman et al. (2019)
Groups capable of flight are in bold type.

A minority hypothesis, credited to the books Predatory Dinosaurs of the World (1988) and Dinosaurs of the Air (2002) by scientific illustrator Gregory Paul, suggests that some groups of non-flying carnivorous dinosaurs — especially deinonychosaurs, but perhaps others such as oviraptorosaurs, therizinosaurs, alvarezsaurids and ornithomimosaurs — actually descend from birds or other flighted maniraptorans. Paul also proposed that the ancestors of these groups were more advanced in their flight adaptations than Archaeopteryx. The hypothesis would mean that Archaeopteryx is less closely related to extant birds than these dinosaurs are. In 2016, Paul suggested that omnivoropterygid avialans were closely related to oviraptorosaurs and that jeholornithid avialans were closely related to therizinosaurs; he considered them to not be avians but suggested that they shared a flighted ancestor.

Mayr et al. (2005) analyzed a new, tenth specimen of Archaeopteryx, and concluded that Archaeopteryx was the sister clade to the Deinonychosauria, but that the more advanced bird Confuciusornis was within the Dromaeosauridae. This paper, however, excluded all other birds and thus did not sample their character distributions. The paper was criticized by Corfe and Butler (2006) who found the authors could not support their conclusions statistically. Mayr et al. agreed that the statistical support for the authors' earlier paper was weak but stated that it is also weak for the alternative scenarios.

Most subsequent cladistic analyses do not support Paul's hypothesis about the position of Archaeopteryx. Instead, they indicate that Archaeopteryx is closer to birds, within the clade Avialae, than it is to deinonychosaurs or oviraptorosaurs. Microraptor, Pedopenna, and Anchiornis all have winged feet, share many features, and lie close to the base of the clade Paraves. This suggests that the ancestral paravian may have been a four-winged glider. Deinonychus may also display partial volancy, with the young being capable of flight or gliding and the adults being flightless. In 2018, a study concluded that the last common ancestor of the Pennaraptora had joint surfaces on the fingers, and between the metatarsus and the wrist, that were optimised to stabilise the hand in flight. This was seen as an indication for secondary flightlessness in heavy basal members of that group. Hartman et al. (2019) found it likely that Archaeopteryx was more closely related to dromaeosaurs than to birds, but the distribution of flying taxa among flightless ones suggests multiple origins of flight among maniraptoran theropods instead of only one.

In Euornithes, the earliest unequivocal example of secondary flightlessness is Patagopteryx.

== See also ==
- Bird ichnology
- Dinosaur Discovery Museum
- Evolution of birds
- Feathered dinosaurs
- Flightless birds
- List of extinct birds
- Origin of avian flight
- Temporal paradox (paleontology)
