= Dinosaur Discovery Museum =

Museum in Kenosha, Wisconsin

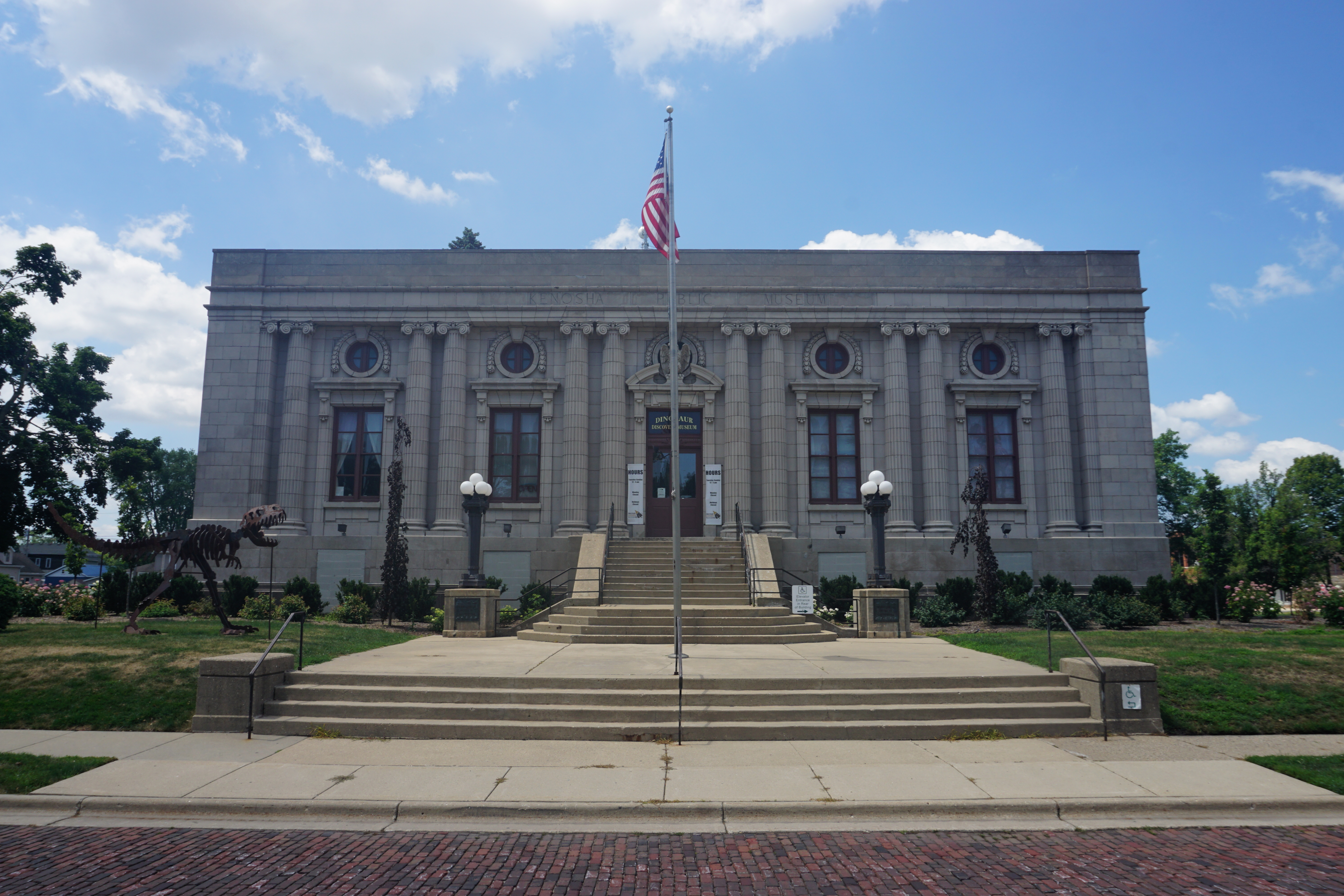
- The building is a former U.S. Post Office
- Established: 2006
- Location: 5608 10th Avenue; Kenosha, Wisconsin
- Coordinates: 42.5839°N 87.82365°W
- Type: Paleontology, with a focus on theropods
- Curator: Nick Wiersum
- Public transit access: Kenosha Streetcar; Kenosha Area Transit
- Website: museums.kenosha.org

The Dinosaur Discovery Museum is a natural history museum in Kenosha, Wisconsin, United States. It is dedicated to the exploration and explication of the relationship between the theropods, which include early and modern birds and ancient carnivorous biped dinosaurs such as Carnotaurus, Tyrannosaurus rex, and Archaeopteryx.

The museum has the largest skeletal cast collection of theropods dinosaurs in North America and is the only museum to focus a gallery specifically on the evolution of birds (avian dinosaurs) from non-avian dinosaurs, with a second smaller gallery focusing on "Little Clint", a three-year-old Tyrannosaurus uncovered by a dig conducted with the Carthage Institute of Paleontology. The museum is located in the former post office (later the home of the Kenosha Public Museum building) and is a part of the Kenosha Public Museums system.

== Carthage Institute of Paleontology ==
Prior to 2026 the Dinosaur Discovery Museum was home to the Carthage Institute of Paleontology. The institute was founded in 2004 and, at the time of its closing, was staffed by Paleontologist Thomas Carr and fossil preparator Megan Seitz and funded by Carthage College as part of their paleontology courses. While in operation, the institute conducted expeditions on Bureau of Land Management (BLM) plots within the Hell Creek Formation, during which students and volunteers participated in authentic paleontological digs. In accordance with the research permits required to collect fossils from BLM land, all fossils collected on these trips were kept, organized and cleaned in the institute's federally recognized lab and archive, all housed within the museum.

During the 2006 and 2007 seasons, the institute and its volunteers discovered remains of one of the youngest known Tyrannosaurus rex which they named "Little Clint" and now features in a permanent exhibit within the museum. Over the years of its operation, expeditions unearthed fossils of hadrosaurs and ceratopsians, as well as many small aquatic vertebrate specimens common to the Hell Creek Formation such as crocodile teeth and osteoderms, turtle shells and gar scales.

In 2020 as part of cost-saving measures by Carthage College, funding for Seitz's position was cut. Due to the importance of that position, Carr secured research grants to continue funding the role. In 2022 the institute made a notable find when a volunteer discovered fragments of another juvenile Tyrannosaurus rex skeleton, of which no additional remains have been found as of yet. Following the 2023 season, Seitz departed the institute for a museum in Colorado, and a field assistant was hired for 2024 using the last of the grand funding. Carr left the institute in 2025 over the loss of funding and Carthage officially dissolved the institute on January 4, 2026. The museum remains a federal repository for storing fossils.

== History ==
The museum opened in 2006. During the Kenosha unrest following the shooting of Jacob Blake, a Dilophosaurus statue outside the museum was toppled, and the museum was temporarily closed for repairs.

== Gallery ==
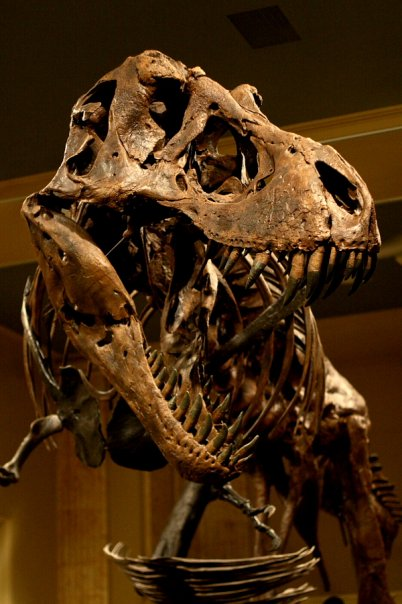
A mount of "Stan", a Tyrannosaurus rex cast that greets visitors to the museum.

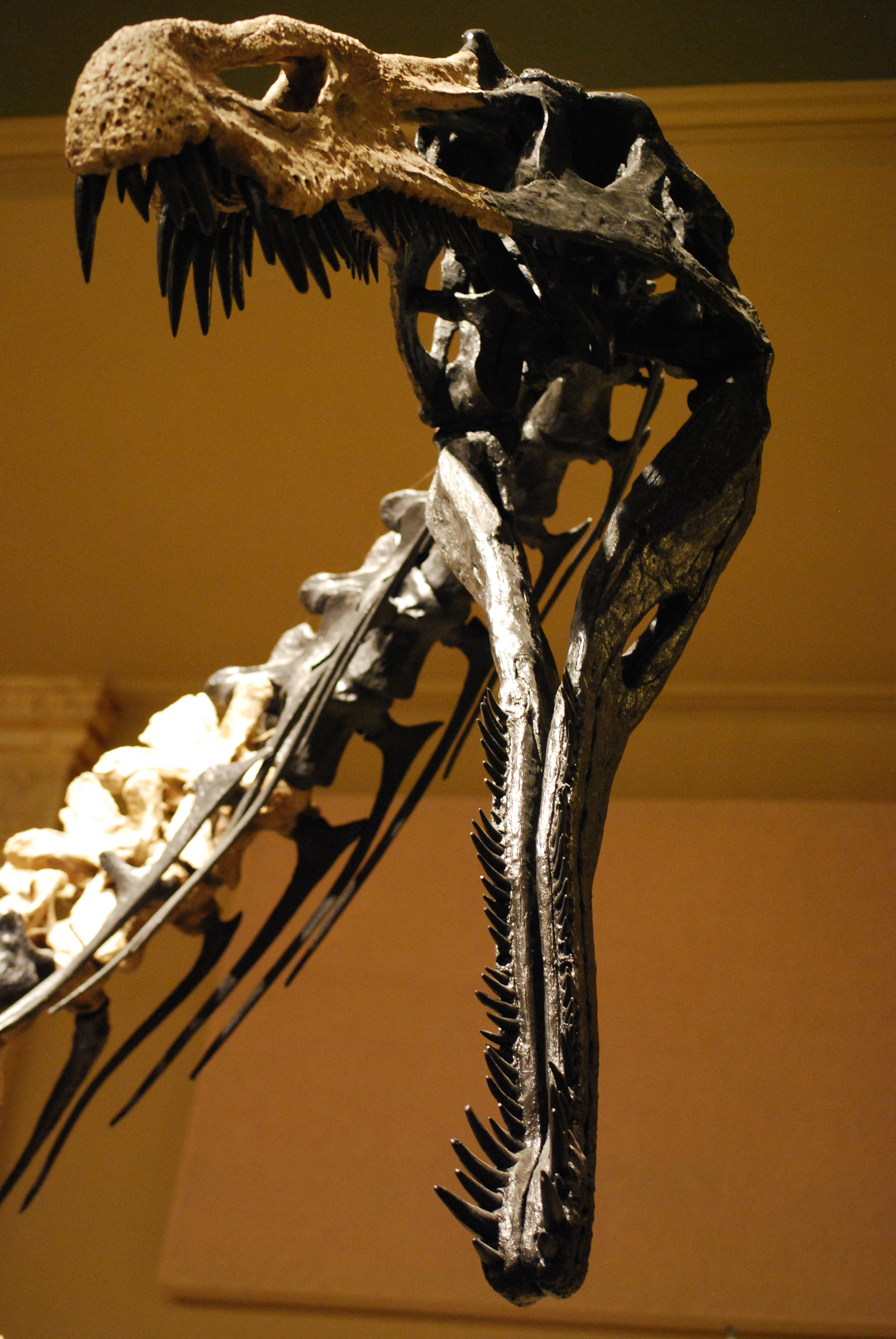
The skull of the Suchomimus mount.

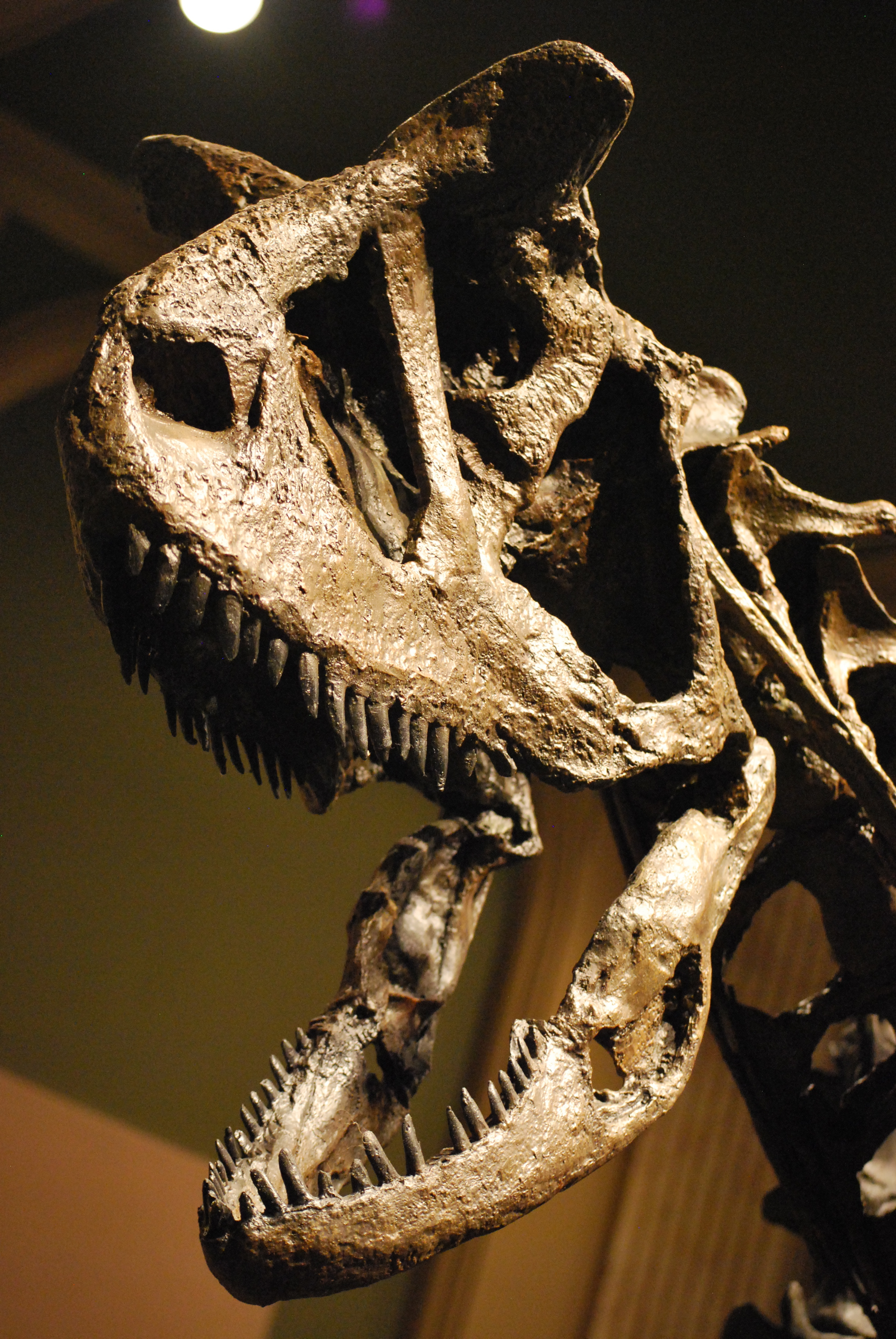
The skull of the Carnotaurus mount.

== See also ==
- Origin of birds
- Feathered dinosaurs
- Kenosha Public Museum
- List of museums in Wisconsin
