= Kenosha Public Museum =

Museum in Kenosha, Wisconsin, United States

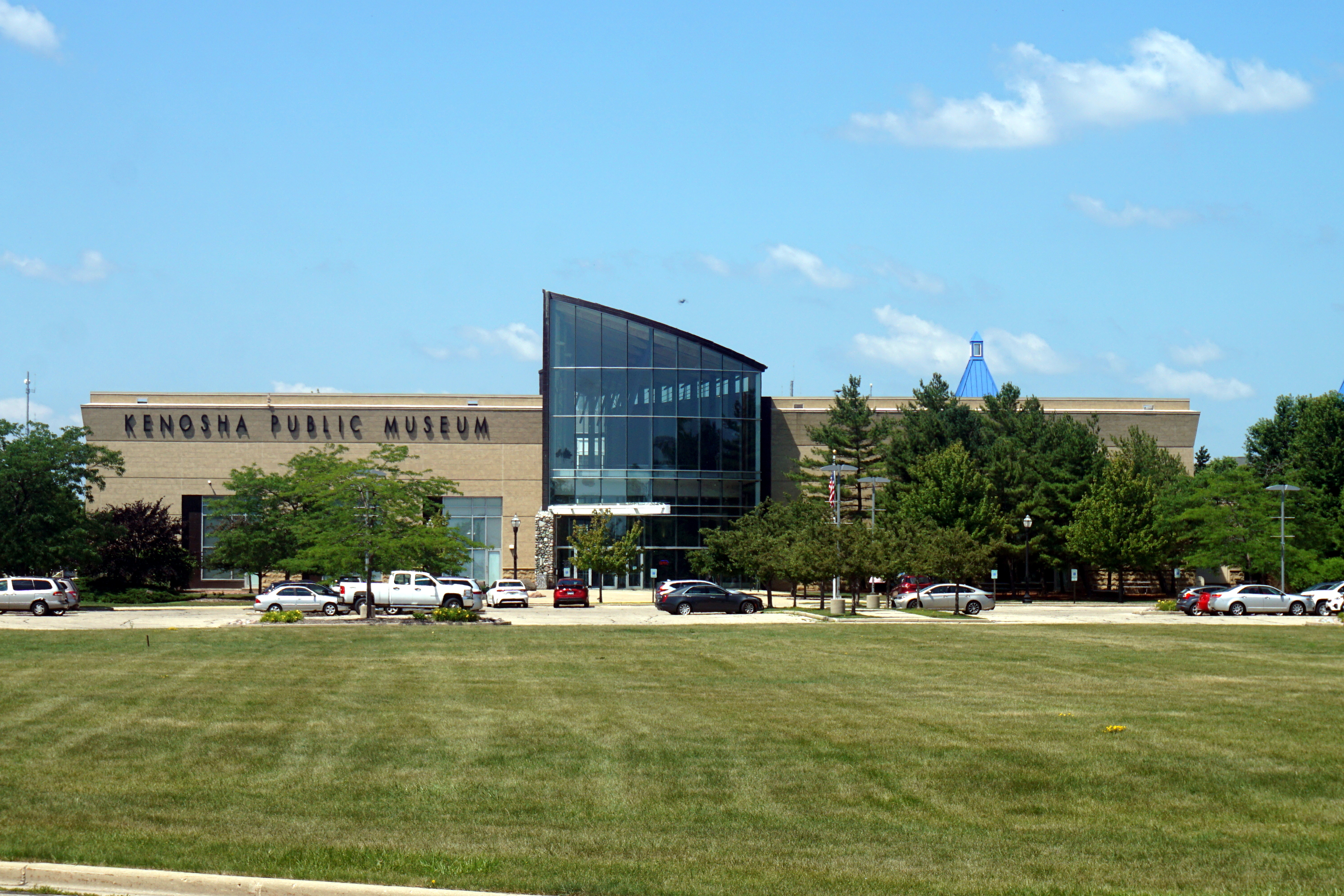
- Kenosha Public Museum in 2022
- Established: 1936
- Location: 5500 1st Avenue, Kenosha, Wisconsin, U.S.
- Coordinates: 42.5862°N 87.8131°W
- Type: Natural sciences, Fine arts, Decorative arts
- Collection size: 80,000 (1,200 fine art pieces)
- Director: Dan Joyce
- Public transit access: Kenosha Streetcar
- Website: museums.kenosha.org

The Kenosha Public Museum is a natural sciences and art museum in Kenosha, Wisconsin, United States. It was founded in 1933 and opened to the public in 1936. The museum is located on Kenosha's lakefront and hosts collections, classes, workshops and community events.

== Collections ==
One major exhibit at the Kenosha Public Museum is the Wisconsin Story, which features the Schaefer mammoth remains and a replica of the Hebior mammoth. The Schaefer mammoth is in the collections of the Kenosha Public Museum along with two other mammoths from Mud Lake and the Fenske site. The Schaefer and Hebior mammoths represents the earliest known interaction between man and mammoth, and were excavated by a team of professional archaeologists from all over the state of Wisconsin during the years 1992–1994. The actual Hebior mammoth remains are in the collection of the Milwaukee Public Museum, however, the Friends of the Museum provided the funds for the Kenosha Public Museum to acquire a replica. The Wisconsin Story exhibit also features Native Americans through time, the coming of Europeans to Wisconsin and a Potawatomi village in four seasons.

Exhibit galleries house changing works of art created by masters, as well as locally-known artists. Usually, certain wings and galleries do not house permanent collections, but rather display exhibitions such as "Rembrandt: States, Fakes, and Restrikes," an Inuit art display, or traveling exhibitions like "Sustainable Shelter."

== History ==
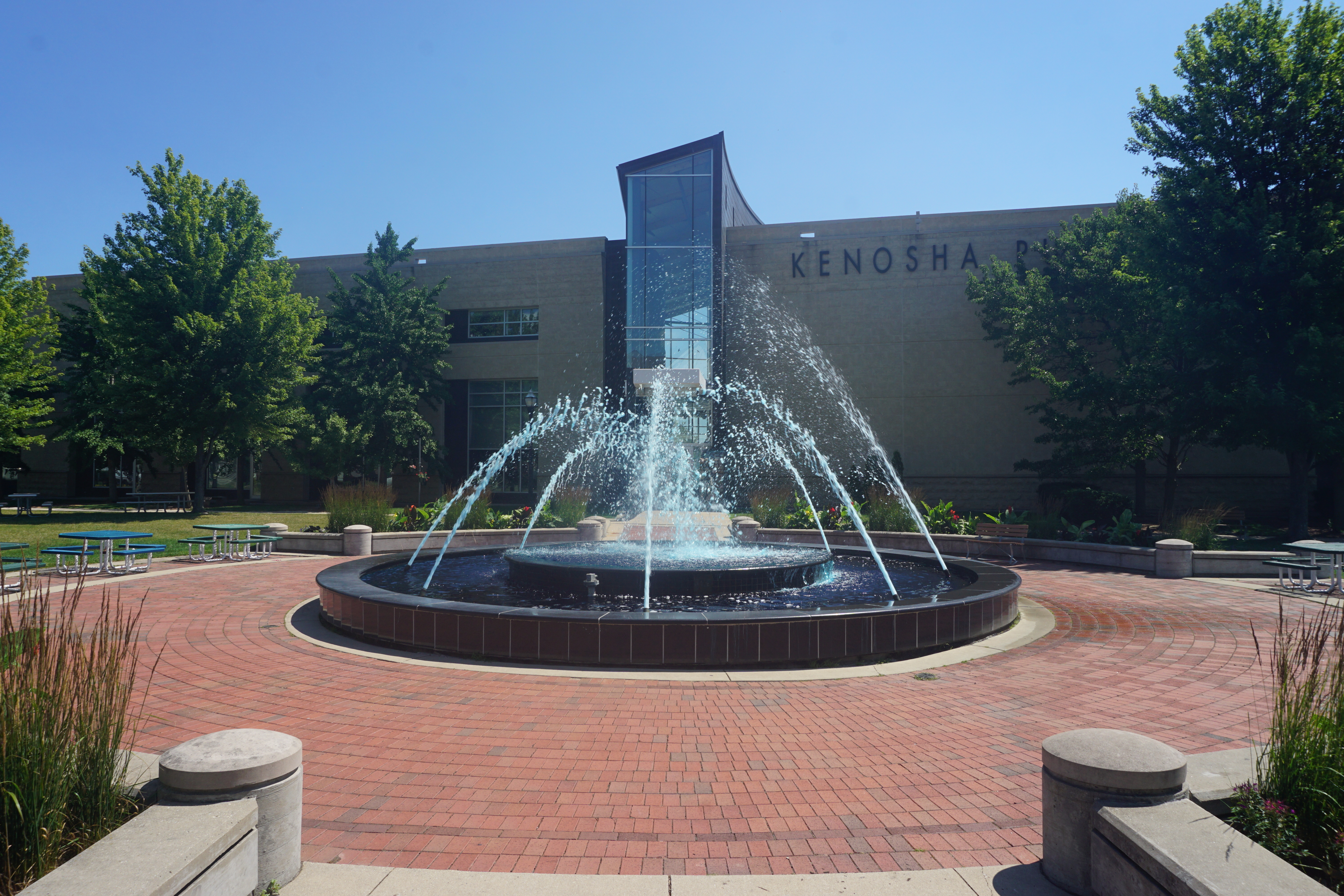
Fountain and entrance to the Kenosha Public Museum

The Kenosha Public Museum was first located on the southwest corner of 56th Street and Eighth Avenue, behind the current Post Office building, in a one-story Beaux Arts building. This building, designed by James Knox Taylor, was completed between 1908 and 1910. The building was moved in 1933, one foot at a time, across the street to its current location at 5608 10th Avenue. Originally, the building served as the city's Post Office, but upon completion of the new post office in 1933, it became the Kenosha Public Museum.

In 2001, the museum moved to a 45,000-square-foot (4,200 m^{2}) new building designed by Engberg Anderson. The architectural design is meant to reflect the shape of the glaciers that shaped the surrounding countryside. The Kenosha Public Museum is part of a museum system also including the Dinosaur Discovery Museum and the Civil War Museum. The museums are accredited by the American Alliance of Museums, certified Travel Green Wisconsin destinations and are an affiliate within the Smithsonian Affiliations program.

== See also ==
- Dinosaur Discovery Museum
- List of museums in Wisconsin
