= Wing-assisted incline running =

Moving behavior of birds

Wing-assisted incline running (abbreviated as "WAIR") is a running behavior observed in living birds as well as a model proposed to explain the evolution of avian flight. WAIR allows birds to run up steep or vertical inclines by flapping their wings, scaling greater inclines than possible through running alone. The WAIR origin-of-flight hypothesis proposes that the nascent wings of theropod dinosaurs were used to propel the animal up slopes, such as cliffs or trees, in a similar manner to that employed by modern birds, and that powered flight eventually evolved from this usage. During its proposal, it was suggested that WAIR might have plausibly been used by feathered theropods like Caudipteryx to develop aerial flight.

== WAIR in living birds ==
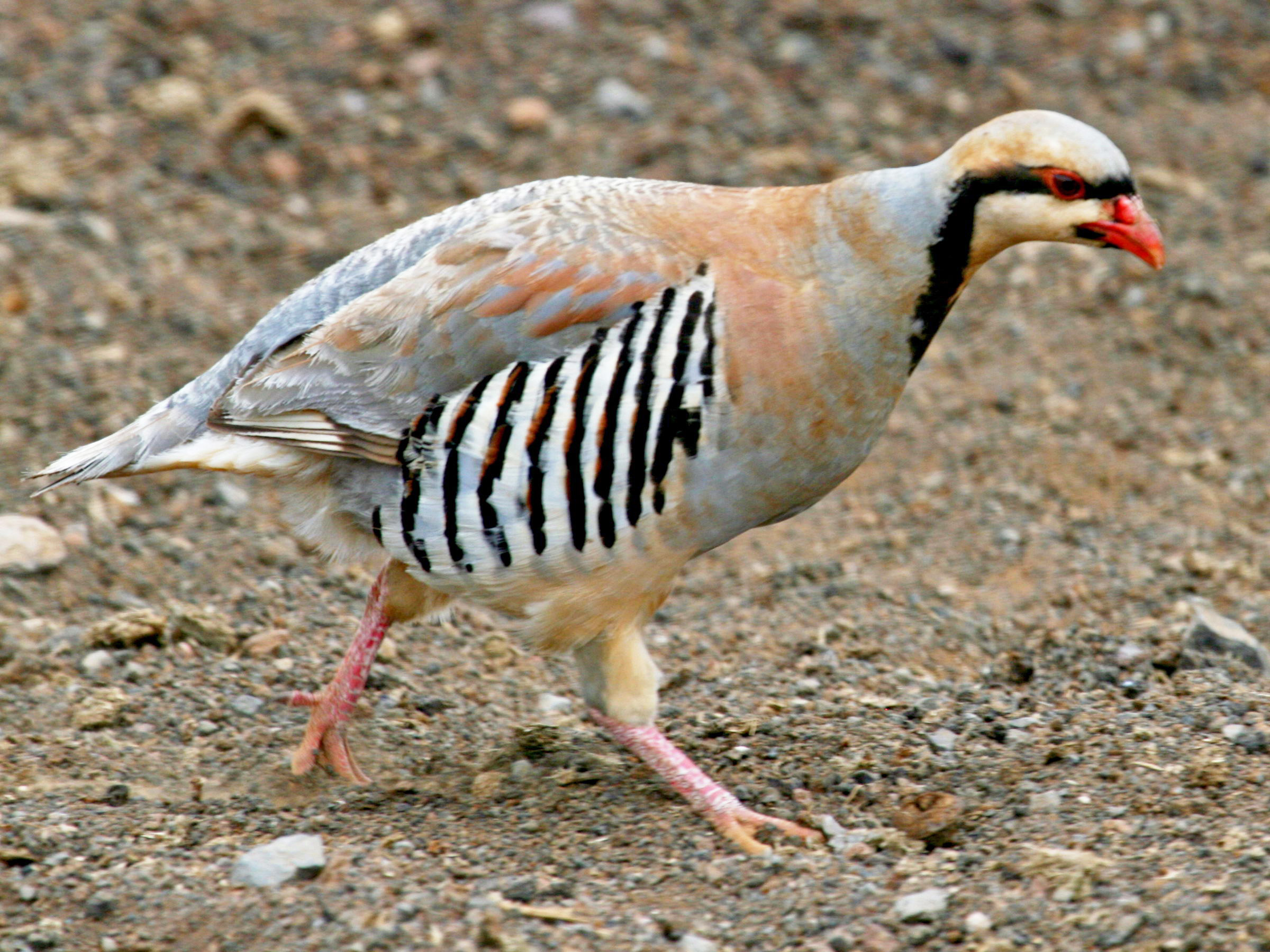
An adult chukar running on a horizontal plane

Wing-assisted incline running has been studied extensively in chicks of the chukar partridge (Alectoris chukar), and has been observed in juveniles and adults of other species of Galliformes as well as the rock dove (Columba livia). In chukar chicks, WAIR was experimentally demonstrated by comparing maximum inclines ascended by normal chicks to those with wing feathers trimmed or plucked entirely. On both smooth and rough surfaces, normal chicks were able to run up much steeper slopes than the other two groups, reaching maximum angles of 105° from the horizontal. Chicks used running alone at slopes up to 45°, then employed wing-flapping at greater slopes, and maximum slope successfully scaled increased with age. When baby chukars hatch, they have not yet developed their flight feathers. As the babies develop, it takes approximately one week for feathers to appear, and about three weeks for the ability to fly. As the baby chukars grow and before flying for the first time, they use WAIR as a transition to adult flight. WAIR has also been studied in the Australian brushturkey (Alectura lathami), although maximum slope decreased with age, such that hatchlings could scale greater slopes (up to 110°) than adults (up to 70°). In rock doves, adults employ WAIR at angles greater than 65°.

=== Explanation of using WAIR over normal flight ===
These galliformes might use WAIR instead of normal flight to reach tree branches because WAIR uses less energy than normal flight. Fewer muscles are used in the process of WAIR than normal flight, specifically pectoral and shoulder muscles which contribute to wing flapping. This provides an additional explanation as to why birds continue to use WAIR: it is faster than normal flight take-off, and running requires less energy than does flying. Therefore; the hindlimbs, in conjunction with the wings, may produce quick bouts of energy which may allow the bird to catch prey. This strategy also allows energy to be stored for use in a fight-or-flight situation such as to escape becoming eaten or caught. WAIR imposes less aerodynamic and physical forces than normal avian flight on the bird, an advantageous trait which may increase fitness. WAIR could have been used for balance purposes. Many theories propose that the manifestation of WAIR in birds is for predatory escape purposes, in that they are able to run up extremely steep and past vertical slopes (such as the trunk of a tree) to escape from a ground-dwelling predator. Another reason for the manifestation of WAIR may be for dispersal or to find food or resources, but this idea is mostly proposed as a survival strategy.

== Origin of flight hypothesis ==
The WAIR hypothesis for the origin of flight is a version of the "cursorial model" of the evolution of avian flight, in which birds' wings originated from forelimb modifications that provided downforce, enabling the proto-birds to run up extremely steep slopes such as the trunks of trees. The hypothesis was prompted by the observation of living young chukar chicks using WAIR, and proposes that dinosaur wings developed their aerodynamic functions as a result of the need to run quickly up very steep slopes such as tree trunks, possibly to escape from predators. Originally, it was thought that birds needed downforce to give their feet increased grip in this scenario. However, a study found lift generated from wings to be the primary factor for successfully accelerating, indicating the onset of flight ability was constrained by neuromuscular control or power rather than by the shape of the wing itself, and that partially developed wings not yet capable of flight could indeed provide useful lift during WAIR. Additionally, when both the power and work needed for WAIR were examined, it was identified that the need for pectoral muscles in flight increases with the angle being scaled. Thus, WAIR is a hypothesis providing a model for an evolutionary transition from terrestrial to aerial locomotion as birds skeletally adapted to meet the requirements to scale steeper and steeper inclines by flight. This might have allowed smaller, potentially juvenile maniraptorans to scale the sides of trees to escape predators that were too big to climb. WAIR may have been present in oviraptorosaurs and therizinosauroids, but as the adults, especially of therizinosauroids, would probably break the trees trying to climb, their hatchlings or chicks would have made it up easily. Because of this way to escape predation, early maniraptorans might have evolved their long arms, true feathers and fused wishbones.

=== Response ===
One possible problem with the WAIR origin of flight hypothesis was noticed by Philip Senter. He argued that early birds, including Archaeopteryx, lacked the shoulder mechanism by which modern birds' wings produce swift, powerful upstrokes. Since the downforce on which WAIR depends is generated by upstrokes, Senter argued that early birds were incapable of WAIR or flapping flight.

Evidence has been proposed against the WAIR hypothesis, stating that it is too simplistic and does not take additional information into account. There have been additional mechanisms suggested, such as climbing claws, that would have provided an advantage for the birds, but are absent in fossil records or extant birds. Other arguments against WAIR include a lack of fossil evidence and no additional intermediate or transition stages available for study which would provide supplementary evidence for WAIR.

== See also ==
- Flying and gliding animals
- Outline of birds
