= Specimens of Archaeopteryx =

Dinosaur fossils

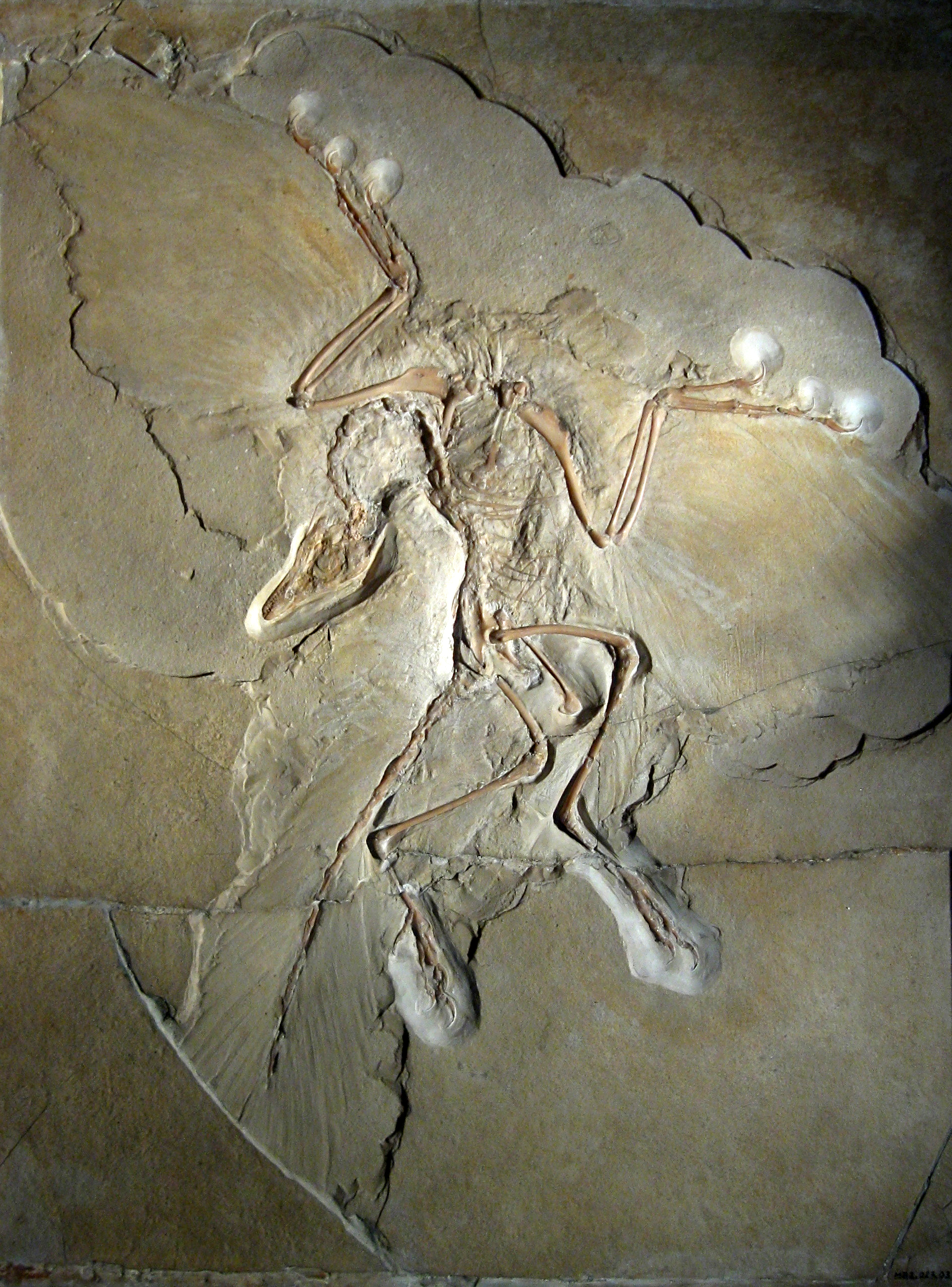
The iconic Berlin specimen of Archaeopteryx

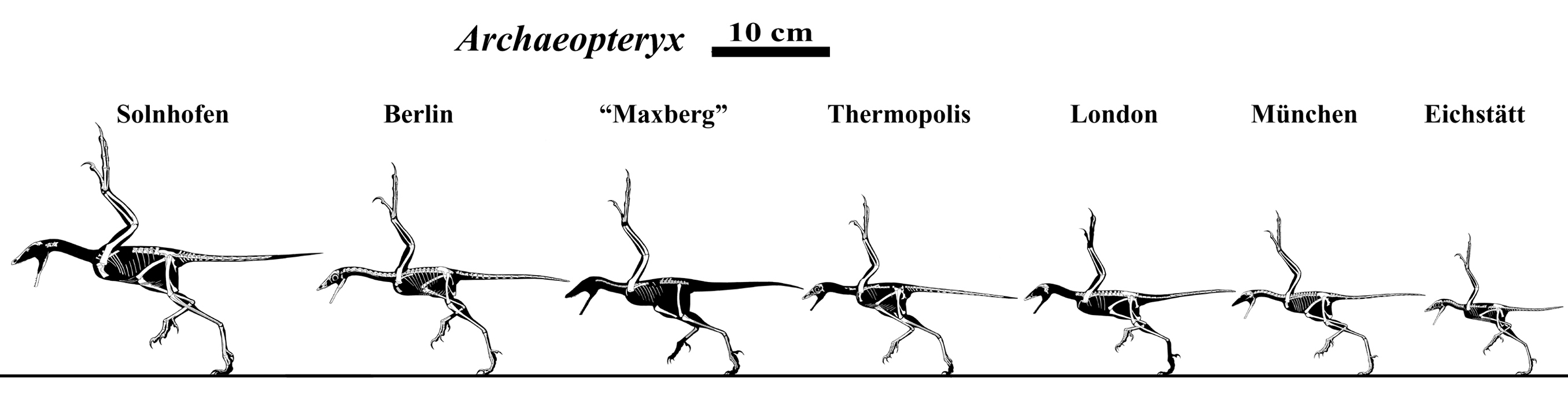
Skeletal reconstructions of seven specimens

Archaeopteryx fossils from the quarries of Solnhofen limestone represent the most famous and well-known fossils from this area. They are highly significant to paleontology and avian evolution in that they document the fossil record's oldest-known birds.

Over the years, fourteen body fossil specimens of Archaeopteryx and a feather that may belong to it have been found, although the Haarlem specimen was reassigned to another genus by two researchers in 2017. All of the fossils come from the upper Jurassic lithographic limestone deposits, quarried for centuries, near Solnhofen, Germany.

== The feather ==
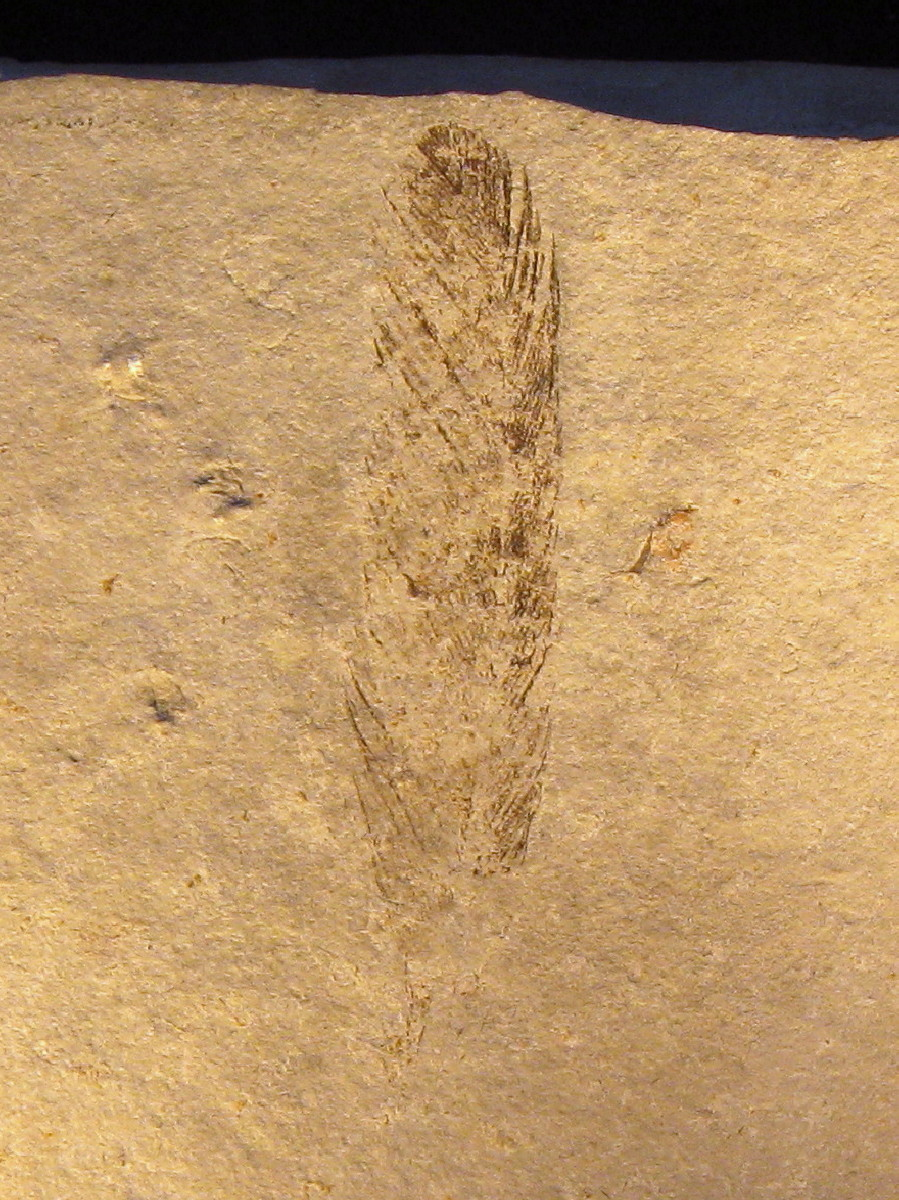
The single feather

The initial discovery, a single feather, was unearthed in 1860 or 1861 and described in 1861 by Christian Erich Hermann von Meyer. The fossil consists of two counterslabs, designated BSP 1869 VIII 1 (main slab) and MB.Av.100 (counterslab), which are currently located at the Bavarian State Collection of Paleontology and Geology of LMU Munich and the Natural History Museum in Berlin, respectively. Although it was the initial holotype, there were indications that it might not have been from the same animal as the body fossils, but from another, as yet undiscovered, avialan.

=== History ===
==== Discovery and acquisition ====
The feather was first described in a series of correspondence letters between Hermann von Meyer and Heinrich Georg Bronn, the editor of the German Jahrbuch für Mineralogie journal. Examining the fossil on both counterpart split slabs, von Meyer immediately recognized it as an asymmetrical bird feather, most likely from a wing, with an "obtusely angled tip" and a "here and there gaping vane", and noted its blackish appearance. Six weeks after writing this first letter in August 1861, von Meyer wrote again to the editor stating that he had been informed of a nearly-complete skeleton of a feathered animal from the same lithographic shale deposits, which would later be known as the London specimen. Coincidentally, von Meyer proposed the name Archaeopteryx lithographica for the feather, but not for the skeleton. Therefore, the official name of the animal was originally linked to the single feather rather than any actual skeleton, and is formally considered the original holotype.

Though 1860 is often the year named for the feather's discovery, there is no proof of this date, and some authors consider it more likely to have been found in 1861, as it seems reasonable that von Meyer's original letter was likely sent not longer after it came into his possession. The feather was discovered in the partition of the Solnhofen Community Quarry located southwest of the municipality of Solnhofen in a forested district known as Truhenleite, which was opened in 1738. 25 meters of the limestone profile of Upper Solnhofen strata are exposed here, but no information was given about which horizon the feather originated from, though the fossil's dark colour may indicate that it came from a deeper level where it was protected from weathering. Today, the quarry is abandoned and the location is built up.

==== Original description ====
Von Meyer published his official description of the feather in the journal Palaeontographica in April 1862, wherein he expressed some doubt of its exact age and affinity. In his original description von Meyer mentioned neither the original discoverer nor the collector by name, and also omitted any diagnostic information about its prior ownership. It wasn't until the year of von Meyer's death, 1869, that the main slab came into the Munich collections. The feather's counterslab was acquired by the Natural History Museum of Berlin in 1876, after having been part of the private collection of von Fischer, a Munich physician.

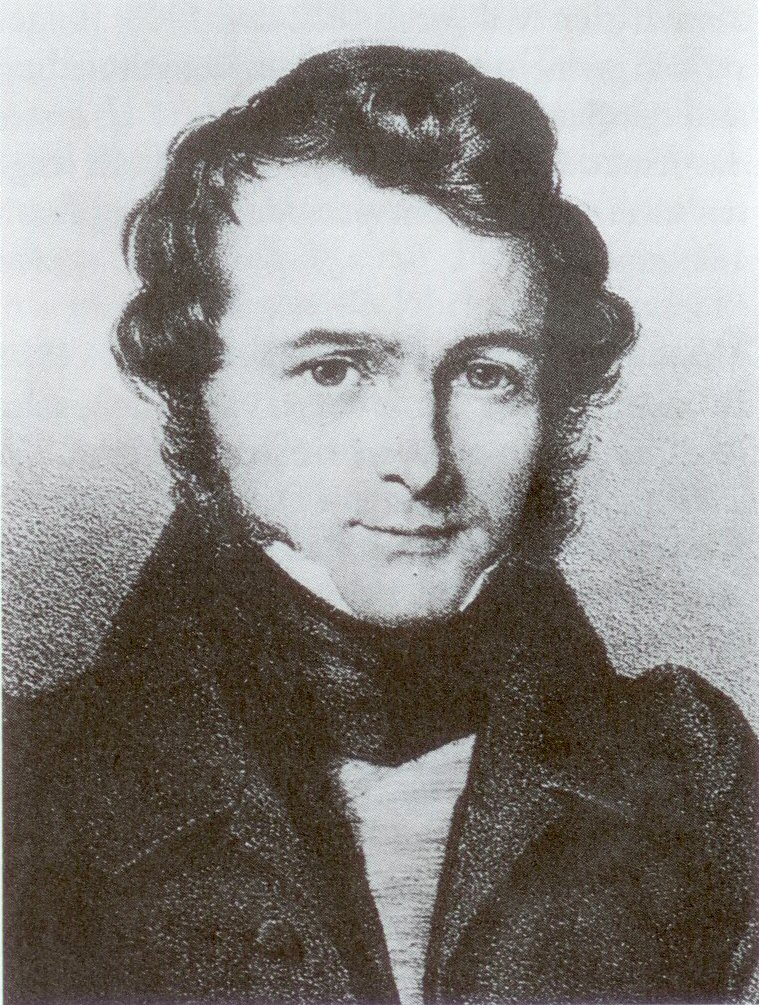
Hermann von Meyer

There was also some initial uncertainty as to whether the fossil represented a real feather as in modern birds, though von Meyer pointed out that he could detect no morphological difference between the fossil imprint and modern feathers, and was able to recognize the central shaft, the barbs and the barbules. He described the lower end of the shaft (the calamus) as being less clearly imprinted than the rest, and concluded that the feather may have belonged to a juvenile individual for whom the shaft was still soft. Von Meyer also noted that due to having been compressed, the vane was split in several places. As part of his original description von Meyer compared the feather to that of a partridge, noting that the only discernible difference was in being slightly smaller and less rounded at the end.

Some doubt also existed at first as to whether the feather was a real fossil from the Solnhofen lithographic limestone. The preservation was regarded by von Meyer as unusual and therefore suspicious, as it appeared to be "transformed into a black substance" that reminded him of dendrites, which are inorganic pseudofossils. He thought it was possible that someone had skillfully painted the feather onto the stone. However, he could not conceive of an artificial way in which such a perfect feather – especially as it was reproduced in a perfect mirror image on both counterslabs – could be created by a human hand, and therefore concluded the feather must be genuine.

Though von Meyer was certain that the fossil feather was real, he was very reluctant to assign it with certainty to a bird, noting that the concurrent feathered skeleton could be "a feathered animal which differs from our birds essentially". His reluctance to link feathers to birds with certainty was prophetic, as it predated the discovery of very advanced, birdlike feathers on non-avian theropod dinosaurs by well over a century.

=== Specimen ===
After von Meyer's original 1862 description, no additional analyses of the feather were performed until 1996, when a detailed assessment of its morphology, function, taxonomy and taphonomy was produced by Griffiths, and the feather was later studied under ultraviolet light in 2004 by Tischlinger and Unwin. The feather was further studied using scanning electron microscopy technology and energy-dispersive X-ray analysis in 2012, and laser-stimulated fluorescence in 2019.

==== Morphology ====
The feather has a total length of 58 mm (2.3 in), and the vane is 12 mm (0.47 in) at the widest margin. The end of the feather has an obtuse angle of 110°, while the barbs branch off from the rachis at an angle of around 25°. The barbs branch noticeably into barbules, as in the feathers of modern birds. The base of the feather consists of plumulaceous barbs which are unconnected to one another and result in a down-like appearance. This tuft of down led Griffiths to conclude that Archaeopteryx might have been endothermic in that it implies the use of thermal insulation.

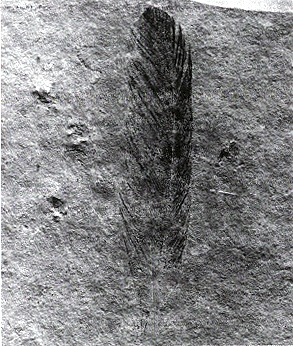
Image of the feather published in von Meyer's 1862 description

The feather is clearly asymmetrical, which has been interpreted by researchers to be a clear indication of its aerodynamic function as a flight feather. As the feather bears little resemblance to the rectrices (tail feathers) of the other full Archaeopteryx skeletons, it is generally thought to be a wing feather: Griffiths and others have concluded it was a remex (wing feather), while Carney and colleagues in 2012 interpreted it to be a covert feather. The feather has a relatively low degree of asymmetry, which Speakman and Thompson in 1994 concluded to indicate it as a secondary remex. If this is the case, then it would have originated from an animal smaller than even the Eichstätt specimen, which is the smallest Archaeopteryx specimen known to date. This is consistent with von Meyer's much earlier interpretation of the feather as having belonged to a juvenile.

Although the calamus (quill) of the feather is no longer visible, Kaye and colleagues identified a corresponding geochemical halo using laser-stimulated fluorescence in 2019. On this basis, they cast doubt against all of these interpretations. First, they noted that the feather is more curved and less asymmetrical than the known primary remiges of Archaeopteryx, and too short relative to the secondary remiges of other specimens. Unlike the coverts of modern birds, they also noted that the center line of the calamus is straight and not S-shaped, although they did not rule out a covert or contour (body) feather identity. Carney and colleagues provided a rebuttal to Kaye and colleagues in 2020; they noted that Kaye and colleagues underestimated the length of the calamus based on von Meyer's description, and noted that coverts without S-shaped center lines are found at the wing tips of birds. They considered the feather to be more consistent with an upper major primary covert than any other type of feather.

==== Colouration ====
The feather was studied under UV light by Tischlinger and Unwin in 2004, and they found that a pattern of dark and light spots were visible on each side of the shaft. This was interpreted as remnants of the original pigment design that would have been on the feather in life, similar to the spots and bars on the feathers of modern partridges or birds of prey. It isn't possible to be certain of this, however, so conclusions about the colouration and patterning of the plumage cannot be drawn with certainty from this study.

In 2012, Carney and colleagues performed the first colour study on an Archaeopteryx specimen with the fossil of this single feather. Using scanning electron microscopy technology and energy-dispersive X-ray analysis, the team was able to detect the structure of melanosomes in the fossil. The resultant structure was then compared to that of 87 modern bird species and was determined with a high percentage of likelihood to be black in colour. While the study does not mean that Archaeopteryx was entirely black, it does suggest that it had some black colouration which included the coverts (or possibly the secondary remiges). Carney pointed out that this is consistent with what we know of modern flight characteristics, in that black melanosomes have structural properties that strengthen feathers for flight. In 2020, they re-performed the analysis using the specimen's melanosome imprints and an expanded dataset of birds, and predicted a matte black (non-iridescent) colouration with high probability. They reconstructed the entire feather as black, with a darker tip.

==== Taphonomy ====
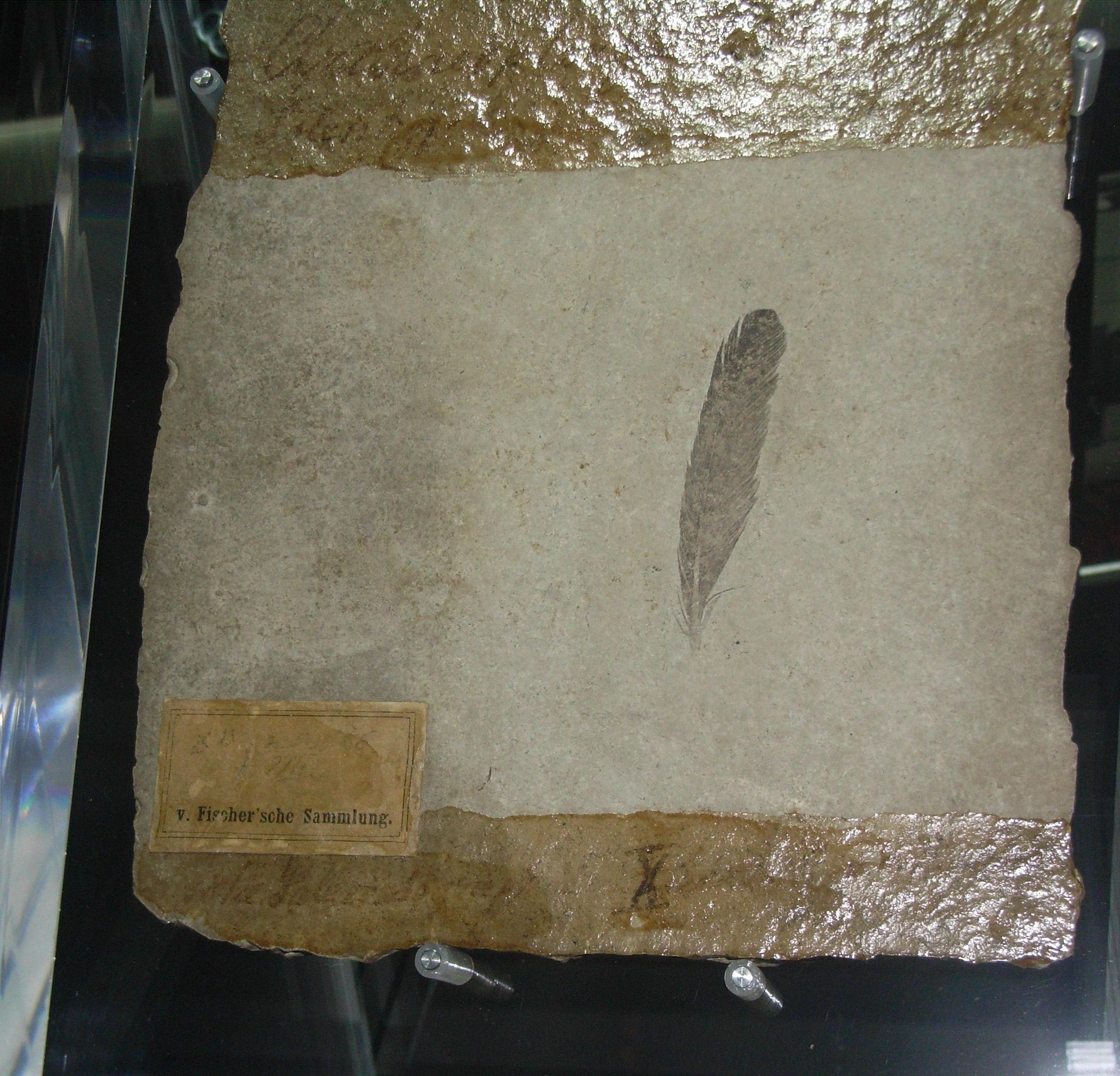
The feather, shown on full slab of Solnhofen limestone

The preservation of the fossil feather is unusual. In contrast to the feather imprints found on the full skeletons of Archaeopteryx, the isolated feather is preserved as a dark film, which could be composed either of organic matter (as in most fossil feathers) or as inorganic minerals. Though it is theoretically possible to determine which it is, studying the physical component of the preserved dark film would require taking away a certain amount of the material from the fossil, and no curator was willing grant permission for such damage to a valuable holotype specimen. Since dendrites are very common in Solnhofen limestones, it is possible that the structures could have formed along the cracks and fissures of the limestone, and subsequently penetrated the minute hollow left in the limestone from the decay of the feather. The manganese dioxide solutions could then have imitated all of the fine detail of the original feather, creating a pseudomorph.

Billy and Cailleux, in 1969, proposed a mechanism by which bacteria could have created a similar effect with manganese dioxide. Davis and Briggs (1995) studied that the fossilization of feathers often involves the formation of bacterial mats, and found fossil bacteria with scanning electron microscopy upon the fossil feathers of birds from the Eocene Green River Formation and the Cretaceous Crato Formation. However, an SEM investigation on the isolated Archaeopteryx feather would also require a sample to be extracted, and has not yet been done.

One explanation for the marked difference in preservation between the isolated feather and the body feathers of known skeletal specimens is that the single feather was likely shed during molt. This means that it would not have been connected to the body by ligaments and connective tissue, and was probably lost on dry land and was washed or blown into the lagoon. The feather could have been colonized by bacteria during the feather's travel time, as it likely did not sink to the bottom immediately after being shed, which could have initiated the taphonomic processes that rely on the presence of bacteria.

One unique feature of the isolated feather specimen is that it features a series of small black spots and filaments, which are around the same diameter as the feather barbs, both across the feather and along the surfaces of both slabs. Von Meyer pointed out these structures in his original description, and described them as being similar to "short hairs" which probably originated from the animal's skin. However, due to being deposited both on the upper and lower surface of the slabs which indicates they were deposited at different times, it is more likely that they are remnants of plant material that may have been ground down before being washed into the lagoon along with the feather.

==== Taxonomy ====
Archaeopteryx lithographica was initially named for this original feather, rather than the full skeleton that was found around the same time, and the feather was originally the formal type specimen and holotype for the species. There are obvious problems with this idea, such as the fact that the feather may have come from a juvenile, or possibly another species altogether.

The distal obtuse angle at the tip is not a feature found on the feathers of any other Archaeopteryx skeleton with integument imprints. It is possible, however, that the strange angle of the tip is an artifact caused by inappropriate preservation, as pointed out by Tischlinger and Unwin in 2004. Speakman and Thomson also found that the degree of asymmetry is different in this isolated feather than it is in similar feathers of the skeletal specimens of Archaeopteryx – the asymmetry of feathers in the skeletons ranged from 1.44 in the London specimen to 1.46 in the Berlin specimen, while the single feather as an asymmetry ratio of 2.2. These measurements are not conclusive, however, because the differences in asymmetry may be due to incomplete distal ends, overlapping, or monomorphic scaling, and may be meaningless for ascertaining the phylogenetic position of this feather.

Owing to the inconsistency in morphology between the feather and other known Archaeopteryx specimens, Kaye and colleagues also suggested in 2019 that may have originated from another dinosaur, either an avialan or a more basal member of the wider group Pennaraptora. However, Carney and colleagues cast doubt on this suggestion in 2020, noting that the feather is proximal in time and space to other Archaeopteryx specimens, and that it would be more probable for the feather to be within the range of individual variation among Archaeopteryx.

Whether the feather truly belongs to Archaeopteryx or to a different taxon remains unresolved, but what is certain is that the feather does represent the oldest example of a bird feather in the fossil record.

== The London specimen ==
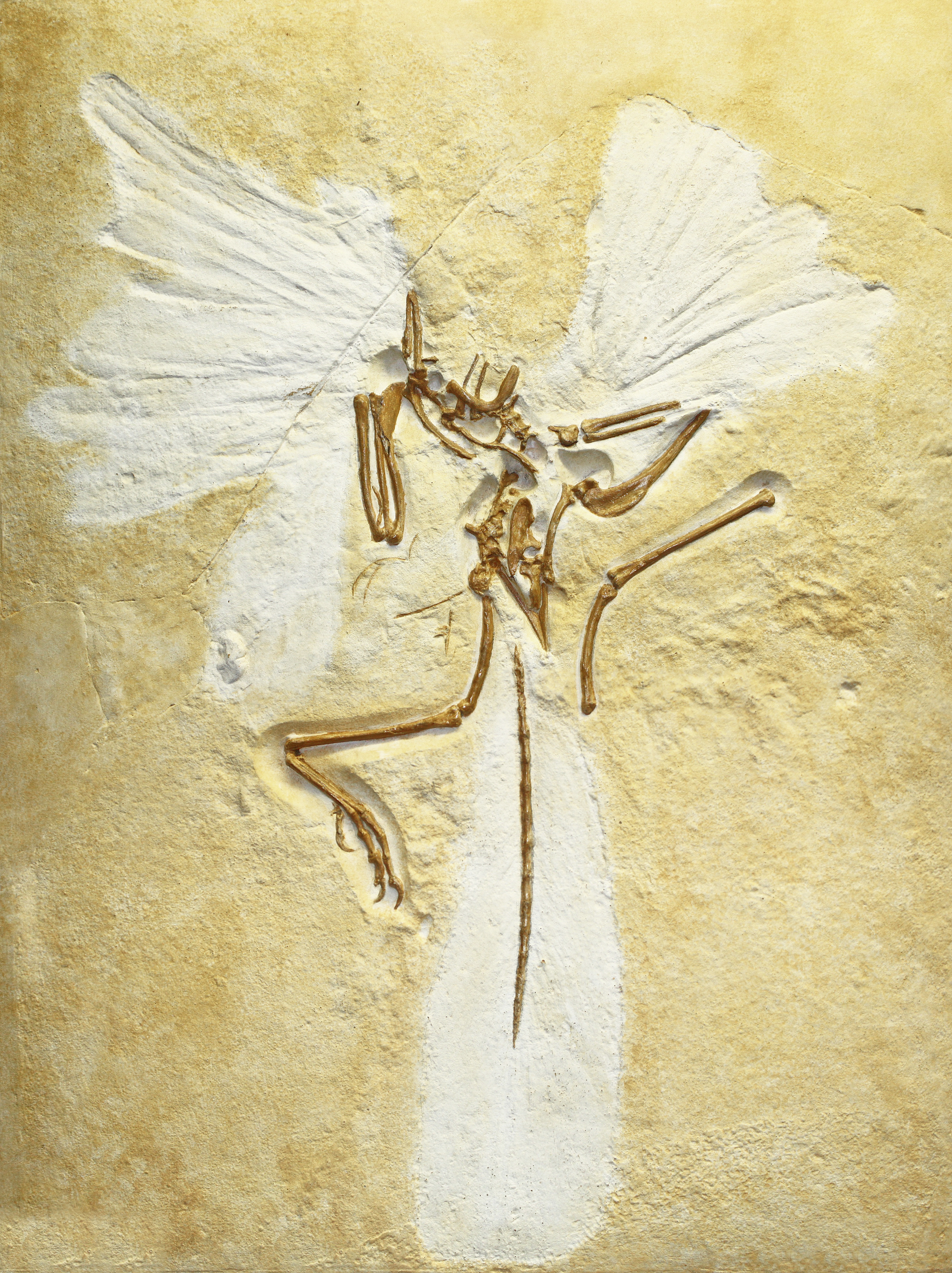
Replica of London specimen

The first skeleton, known as the London Specimen (BMNH 37001), was unearthed in 1861 near Langenaltheim, Germany and perhaps given to a local physician Karl Häberlein in return for medical services. He then sold it for £700 to the Natural History Museum in London, where it remains. Missing most of its head and neck, it was described in 1863 by Richard Owen as Archaeopteryx macrura, allowing for the possibility it did not belong to the same species as the feather. In the subsequent 4th edition of his On the Origin of Species, Charles Darwin described how some authors had maintained "that the whole class of birds came suddenly into existence during the eocene period; but now we know, on the authority of Professor Owen, that a bird certainly lived during the deposition of the upper greensand; and still more recently, that strange bird, the Archeopteryx, with a long lizard-like tail, bearing a pair of feathers on each joint, and with its wings furnished with two free claws, has been discovered in the oolitic slates of Solnhofen. Hardly any recent discovery shows more forcibly than this how little we as yet know of the former inhabitants of the world."

The Greek term "pteryx" (πτέρυξ) primarily means "wing", but can also designate merely "feather". Von Meyer suggested this in his description. At first he referred to a single feather which appeared like a modern bird's remex (wing feather), but he had heard of and been shown a rough sketch of the London specimen, to which he referred as a "Skelet eines mit ähnlichen Federn bedeckten Thieres" ("skeleton of an animal covered in similar feathers"). In German, this ambiguity is resolved by the term Schwinge which does not necessarily mean a wing used for flying. Urschwinge was the favored translation of Archaeopteryx among German scholars in the late 19th century. In English, "ancient pinion" offers a rough approximation.

=== History ===
Hermann von Meyer learned of the discovery of what would later be known as the London Specimen before he published his analysis of the single Archaeopteryx feather. In September 1861 he wrote to the "Neues Jahrbuch" about being informed of the discovery by Friedrich Ernst Witte, an avid fossil collector and jurist by profession, and commented on the coincidental nature of learning of a feathered skeleton from the Solnhofen strata while studying the feather. Witte had visited a well-known collector of Solnhofen fossils, Dr. Karl Häberlein, in the summer of 1861 whereupon he had first seen this "skeleton of an animal furnished with feathers" at the fossil collector's home in Pappenheim. Clearly recognizing the significance of such a fossil, he then immediately wrote to Hermann von Meyer as well as Andreas Wagner, the Munich Professor of Paleontology. He subsequently traveled to Munich in order to convince Wagner to purchase the fossil for the Bavarian State Collections.

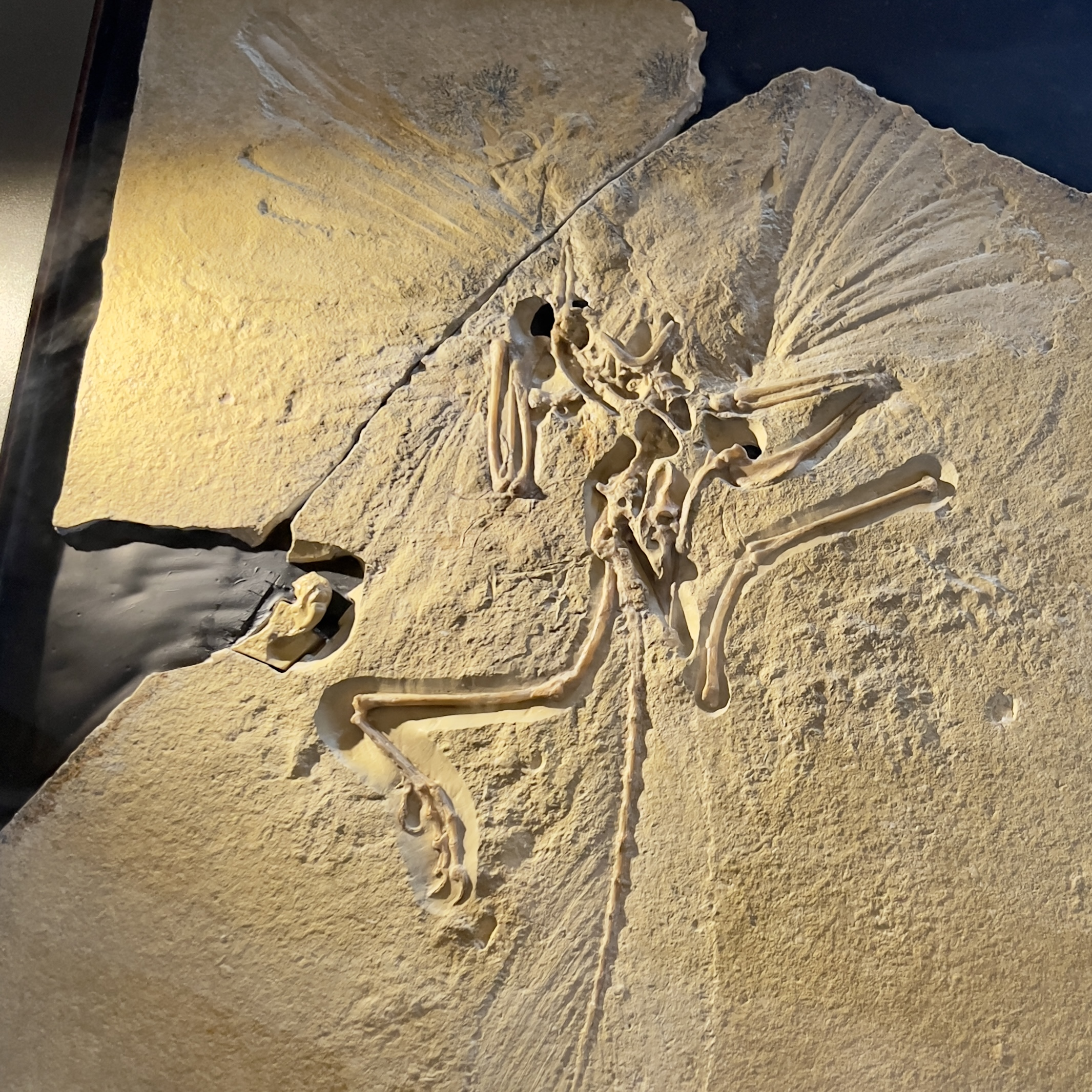
Close up of the specimen

Witte later recounted his visit with Wagner in 1863 in a letter to the editor of "Neues Jahrbuch":

When I first told him of the specimen in order to urge him to buy it for the Munich Collections, he reacted with absolute incredulity, since, according to his view, a feathered creature could only be a bird. But, after his system of creation, a bird could not have existed as early as in the Jurassic Period...

— Friedrich Ernst Witte, Witte 1863

He goes on to describe the visit paid to the fossil by Wagner's assistant after being told of the Solnhofen fossil feather published by von Meyer. Despite this, he still stuck to his conviction that the animal represented a saurian, and named it Griphosaurus.

Witte is regarded as being the main person responsible for alerting the scientific community of existence and significance of the London Specimen. He took a remarkably prescient standpoint in claiming that the debate of whether it was allied with birds or reptiles was irrelevant, and that the animal "has characters of both and is strictly none of them". The only relevant question, he said, was which characters predominate, and which class it must be allied with "for the time being".

It is not known with certainty how Dr. Häberlein first came into possession of the specimen, though as it was found in the section of the Solnhofen Community Quarry belonging to Johann Friedrich Ottman, it is reasonable to assume that Ottman sold the fossil to Häberlein directly. Häberlein offered his feathered fossil to the State Paleontological Collection in Munich after its director, Albert Oppel, examined it in 1861 in Pappenheim. Though Oppel had not been granted permission by the owner to draw the fossil, he retained an accurate memory of its appearance and was able to reproduce it upon his return. The sketch was later given to Wagner, who wanted the honor of describing the fossil first.

Shortly after, Wagner presented a talk at the Bavarian Academy of Sciences, which was later published as an article in 1862. In this talk, Wagner gives a detailed account of the curious combination of avian and saurian features that made the fossil so unique and mysterious. He describes the feather imprints of the fossil to be "those of true birds", and went on to describe other features, like the long tail, that bore "not the least resemblance to that of a bird". He compares the fossil to Rhamphorhynchus, a Solnhofen pterosaur which also possessed a long, bony tail. He regarded the creature as a "mongrel" of bird and reptile, the whole of which was incomprehensible to him.

Despite these comments, Wagner made it clear that he did not regard the feather-like imprints as proof of real bird feathers. He claimed that the imprints may merely be "peculiar adornments" and that he did not hesitate to regard it as a reptile. Wellnhofer points out that his reasoning behind this opinion was likely due to his anti-Darwinist approach to paleontology, which is confirmed in Wagner's November 1862 talk, wherein he makes a statement on the new fossil with the intention to "ward off Darwinian misinterpretations of our new Saurian". He was uncomfortable with the idea that a "transitional fossil" could exist, and in Wagner's creation-centered interpretation of paleontology, there was no room for a form intermediate between reptile and bird.

==== Purchase by the British Museum ====
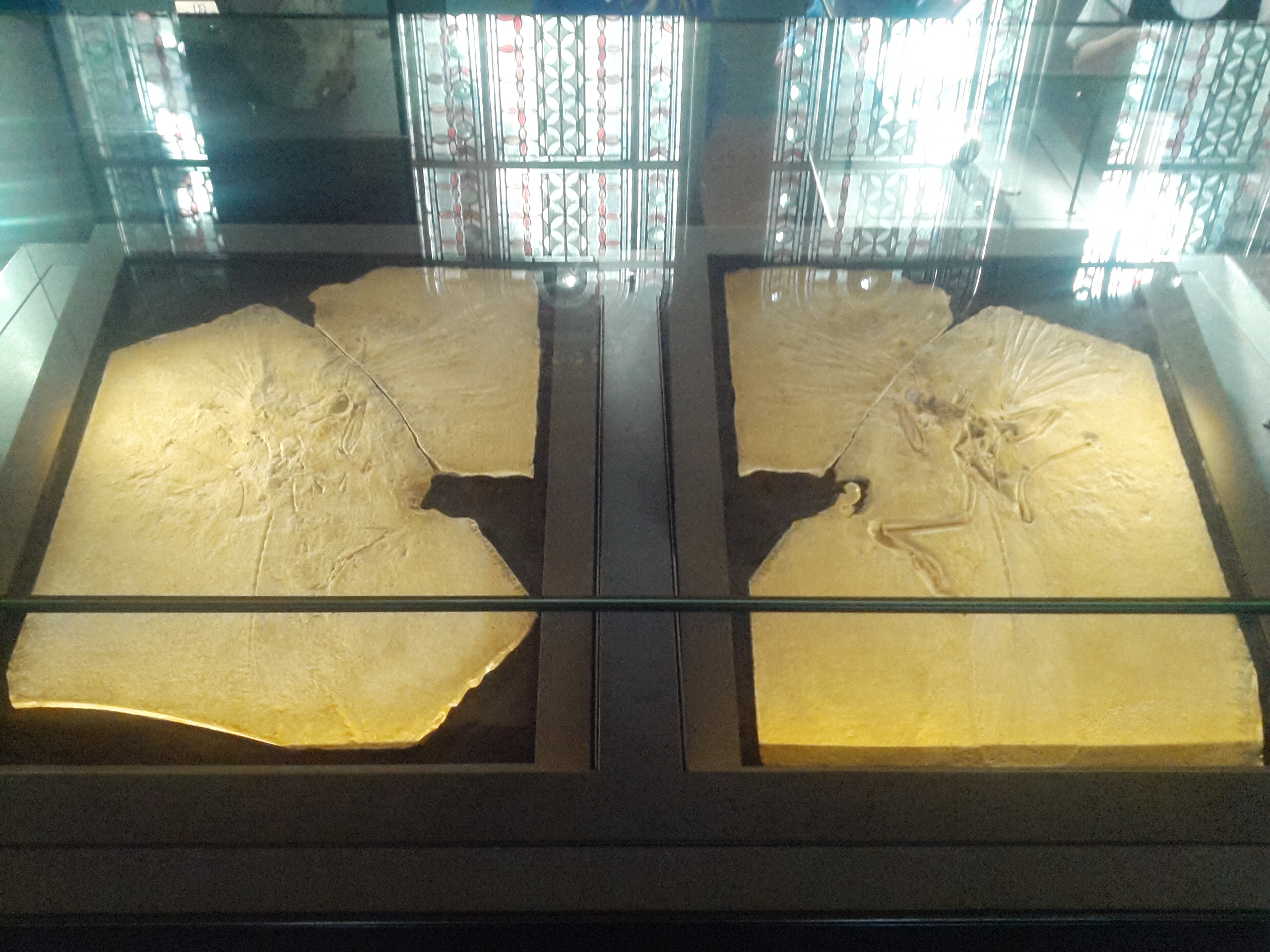
Slabs of the London specimen

While the arguments about the nature of the new feathered animal were underway, negotiations were taking place between Dr. Häberlein and the British Museum of London, as the offer of sale to the Bavarian State Collection had failed. On 28 February 1862, a letter was written by George Robert Waterhouse, the Keeper of the Geological Department of the British Museum, to Häberlein asking if he would be willing to sell the fossil. This letter was written at the request of Richard Owen, who was the Superintendent of the British Museum's Natural History division. Häberlein was interested in selling, but made it clear that he had a lot of other interested potential buyers from a variety of countries, and the competition was driving the price quite high. He was 74 years old and quite ill at the time, and wished to sell his entire collection of Solnhofen fossils, which was fairly substantial. His original price for his full collection was set at 750 pounds sterling. Owen presented this letter to his museum, and was thereafter sent to Pappenheim to negotiate with Häberlein, but had orders to spend no more than 500 pounds. Häberlein, however, was unwilling to part with the fossil for less than 650 pounds.

For several weeks afterwards, the museum struggled to find a solution that would work within the limits of their budget. Waterhouse and Owen finally offered that Häberlein would be paid a sum of 450 pounds for the Archaeopteryx specimen during that year, and an additional 250 pounds would be paid the following year for the rest of the collection. Häberlein agreed to this somewhat grudgingly, and the fossil was packed and shipped to London at the end of September 1862. As promised, the rest of the collection – totaling 1,756 Solnhofen specimens – was purchased the following year. In this way the London Museum came to acquire a truly important collection of fossils, many of them quite rare or undescribed at the time.

Wellnhofer remarks that it was likely not the price that kept the Bavarian State Paleontological Collection in Munich from acquiring the fossil, but rather the hesitating attitude of Andreas Wagner which delayed any action. Following Wagner's death in 1861, negotiations with Häberlein certainly would have been all the more difficult. In the wake of this important transaction of the first Archaeopteryx body fossil, many German scientists bitterly regretted its departure from its native land to London. Frankfurt zoologist David Friedrich Weinland, for instance, commented that "the English became greedy for the treasure".

The collection's final selling price of 700 pounds, or 8,400 Bavarian guldens, was calculated at approximately 18,340 British pounds in 1987, though that calculation may be low. In any case, it was considered to be a small fortune at the time. Häberlein allegedly used the payment as a dowry for one of his daughters.

==== Historical reviews ====
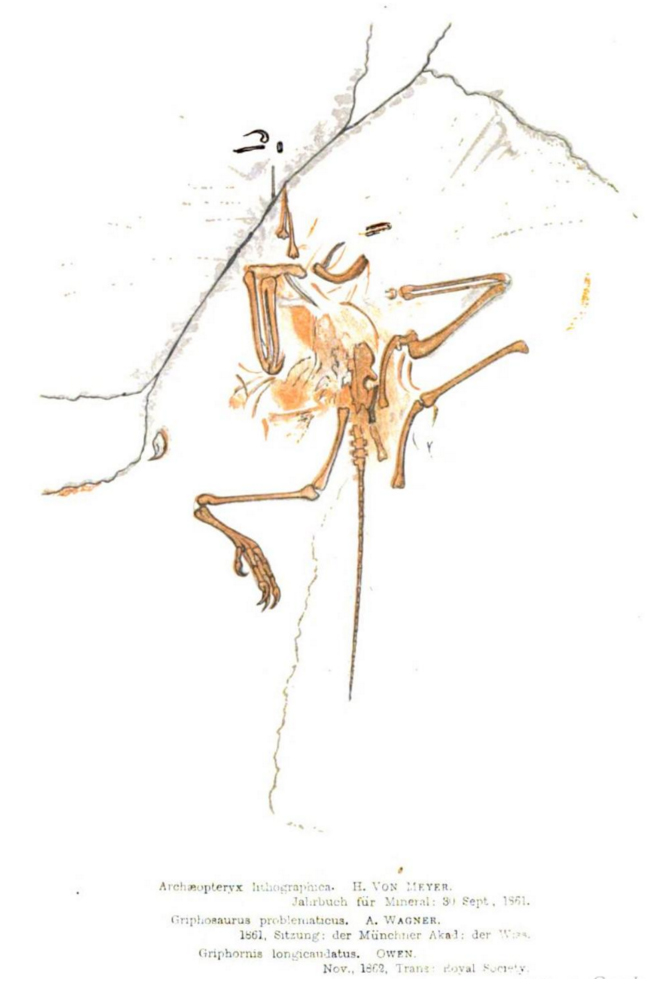
Henry Woodward's London Archaeopteryx sketch

Andreas Wagner produced the first description of the fossil despite having not yet seen it; his interpretation was based on reports of Albert Oppel and Friedrich Ernst Witte. Wagner compared the specimen to the long-tailed pterosaur Rhamphorhynchus and suggested the integument of the London specimen as not being identical to bird feathers. Indeed, Wagner believed the specimen to represent a reptile and attempted to name it Griphosaurus, the enigmatic reptile.

In October 1862, the fossil arrived in London and Richard Owen immediately began the scientific investigation. Then a staunch opponent to the theory of Darwinian evolution, Owen was intensely interested in this so-called transitional fossil that showed a strange mix of avian and reptilian characteristics. His first presentation of the results of his investigation was a talk at the Royal Society in London in November, and was published as an abstract in the Proceedings of the Royal Society the following year. Here he considered the single feather described by von Meyer in 1861 and assigned the new skeleton the same genus. Owen speculated possible short- and long-tailed forms of Archaeopteryx and on these grounds assigned the London specimen the species name macrura, meaning "long-tailed".

Owen, who published a monograph on the specimen in 1863, generally considered the animal to be a bird despite describing its structure and proportions as resembling a flying squirrel. After conducting an embryological comparison with modern birds, he noticed a similarity between Archaeopteryx and the embryonic stage of birds, concluding that the former was likely an "archetype", or created kind, of the bird lineage. Owen's monograph presented a description of the osteology and the plumage, though he missed a number of elements. Owing to its overall similarity to the structure of modern birds, Owen postulated a toothless, horny beak-like instrument "fitted for preening", and misinterpreted the fragment of an upper jaw with teeth, located next to the pelvis on the specimen, as the remains of a fish. Fragments of the braincase and upper jaw were later identified and published by other researchers.

While Owen's 1863 monograph on the specimen is historically considered to be the first real description of Archaeopteryx, Henry Woodward, assistant of the Geological Department of the British Museum, had published a shorter article on the specimen in December 1862. Here he provided a detailed description as well as the first published illustration of the specimen, sketched from the original. Rather than an attempt to steal Owen's glory, Woodward gave him due credit in this article as its official describer. Woodward's article nevertheless precipitated the first surge of widespread knowledge of the specimen across Europe. In the subsequent years of the 19th century, the London specimen was subject to a number of analyses by other researchers of historical importance, including Thomas Huxley, Othniel Charles Marsh, Wilhelm Dames, and Bronislav Petronievics. Much of this early study was relevant to controversy surrounding the possible taxonomic divisions of Archaeopteryx specimens.

=== Specimen ===
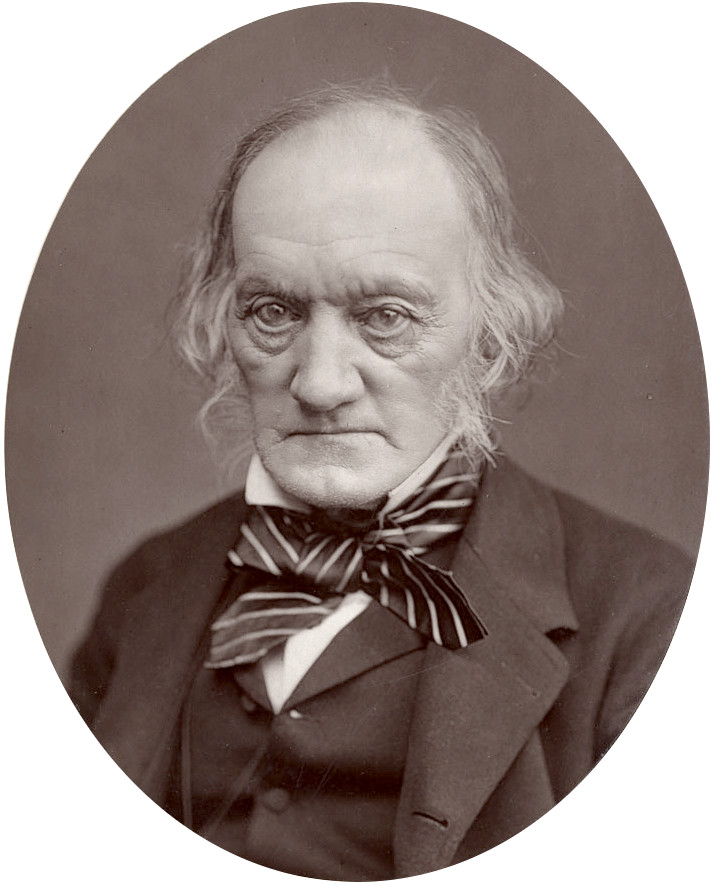
Paleontologist Richard Owen

The London specimen is of obvious special importance because it was the first Archaeopteryx skeleton discovered. By coining the name Archaeopteryx, meaning "ancient wing", von Meyer had declared the animal to be a bird. Despite the feather's earlier discovery, von Meyer made the London fossil the type specimen of the genus (Archaeopteryx) and species (lithographica), establishing it as the exemplar of the species' features. Its discovery and subsequent descriptions, a mere handful of years after Darwin's On the Origin of Species, fulfilled the hope of a truly transitional form in its then-unique amalgamation of bird and reptilian characters.

The specimen is preserved on two counter slabs broken originally into four pieces. The main, overlaying slab contains most of the skeletal elements, while only impressions and a few bone fragments are visible on the counter slab. This means the animal's carcass was pressed against the lagoon floor, representing the main slab. The main slab has a thickness of approximately 6 cm, and the case in which it's set measures a total of 60 x 40 cm.

==== Taphonomy ====
The London specimen shows the animal had undergone an advanced state of decomposition after death, reflected in its missing parts including a foot, some fingers, and the head. Both wings are preserved with spread fan-like with distinct feather impressions. The left hindlimb is preserved complete with four clawed toes; only the upper and lower portions of the right leg remain. The femur, pelvis, and remaining phalanges, while relatively complete, are disarticulated and scattered across the plate. Because of this scattering of the hand bones, Owen erroneously described the hands as two-fingers originally; the animal's three fingers were only known for certainty upon discovery of the Berlin specimen. The London specimen's decomposition is estimated at being on the order of weeks, with a maximum "drifting time" estimated at 27 days. Weeks or months likely elapsed between time of deposition and burial.

==== Skull ====
While Owen essentially missed any signs of the presence of skull fragments, later researchers noticed the fragments but detailed study was made difficult by their being partially hidden within the stone. This resulted in reconstructions of the braincase as being narrower than was probably the case in life until recent decades. Though the specimen appears to be missing the head and was reported as such in the original description, fragments of the skull were isolated by further study in 1982, and a detailed reconstruction of the braincase was achieved a year later. Further studies conducted in the 1980s and '90s revealed that the braincase and ear region, while primitive, are essentially birdlike and similar in structure to that of modern birds. These analyses also further bolstered conclusions that the London specimen is likely to represent a juvenile individual.

Remains of the London specimen's upper jaw are also preserved on the main slab nearby the femur, which includes at least one tooth still in its socket, analyses of which reveal similarity to the teeth of the Berlin specimen. While still other pieces of the skull lie nearby, they are generally fragmentary enough that little can be derived from them unequivocally.

==== Trunk ====
The vertebral column of the London specimen shows an incomplete cervical series, 22 articulated vertebrae above the tail, five or six sacrals, and 23 caudal vertebrae. The number of caudals is one greater than the Berlin and Eichstätt specimens and one more than the Munich specimen, which could be individual variability.

Three left and six right dorsal ribs are preserved in rough articulation with the vertebrae. A number of gastralia are preserved scattered all over the plate. The scapula, coracoid and furcula are all preserved on the main slab. The coracoid is about a third the length of the scapula, and is much less elongated than in modern birds. This shortness originally led de Beer to include that short pectoral muscles of Archaeopteryx likely indicated it had very little flight ability. The furcula (wishbone) is well-preserved and lies between the scapulae; its boomerang-like shape reveals a 75-degree angle between its branches. De Beer identified a compressed mass of bone as a sternum in the London specimen, but later researchers disputed this as more likely to be a concretion of vertebrae encrusted by calcite. That Archaeopteryx lacked a bony sternum is in agreement with the modern consensus that many specimens of Archaeopteryx, including the London, likely represented immature animals whose sterna were still cartilaginous. The pelvic girdle is separated into its three components on the main slab.

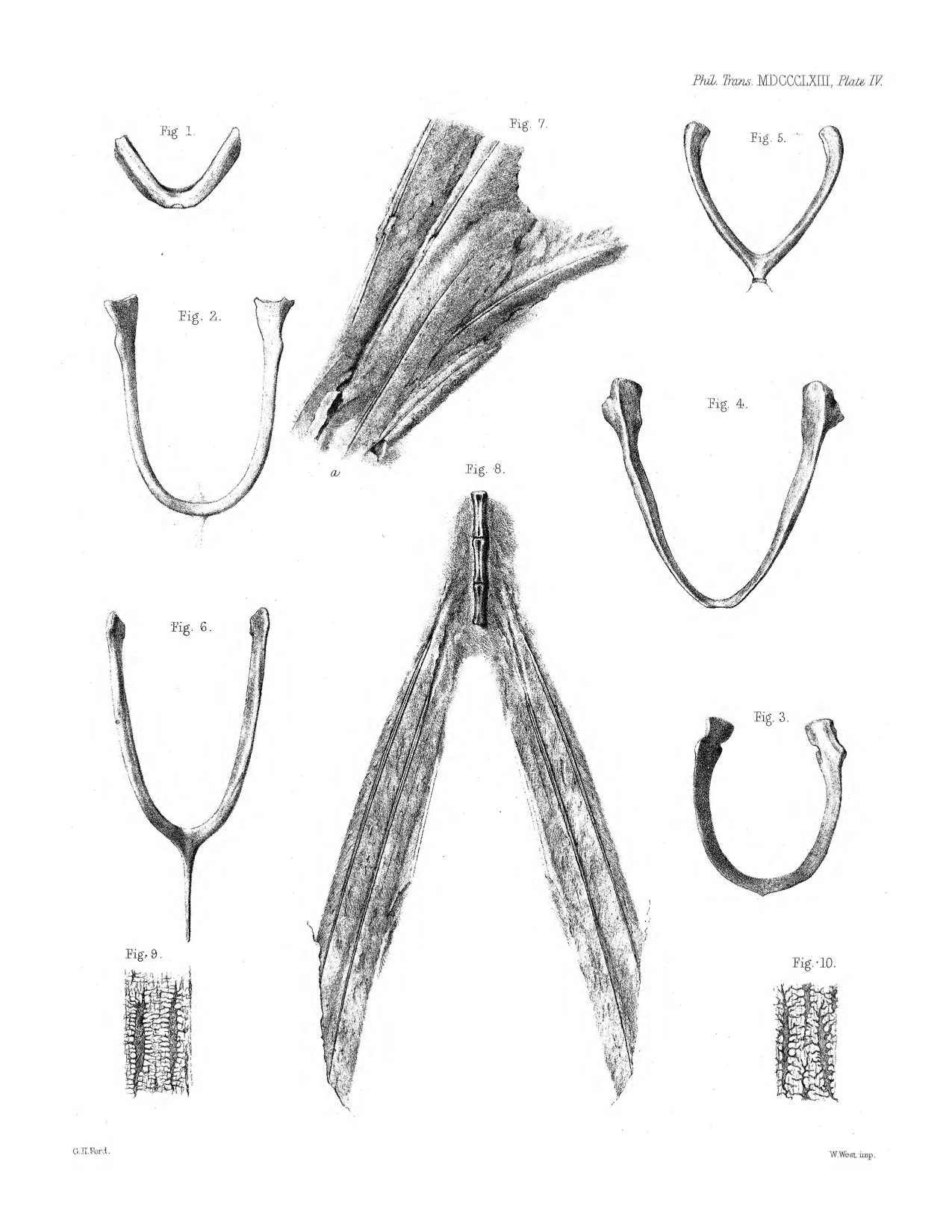
Owen's drawings of elements from the London specimen, including portion of the furculum (figure 1), impression of two primaries and four under-coverts (figure 7), and impressions of caudal plumes (figure 8)

==== Limbs ====
Both arms are preserved close to their natural articulation with the shoulder girdle, though displaced. The ulna is more robust and curved than the slender radius. A confusing jumble of metacarpals has led some researchers to conclude the beginning of fusion between carpals and metacarpals; this has been rejected by later researchers. Most manual bones of the right wing are missing, and the left wing preserves two metacarpals, the semilunate carpal, and two long, slender phalanges with large, strongly curved claws. The missing third finger led Owen to conclude a two-fingered hand for Archaeopteryx in his original description.

The left hindlimb is completely preserved on the main slab, and shows a slightly curved femur, a proximal muscle scar likely to represent the greater trochanter, a slender tibia and fibula, a remarkably birdlike tibiotarsus, and the four delicate toes of the foot. The right hindlimb shows only a disarticulated femur and tibia. The first toe is very short and includes a robust and strongly recurved claw that is oriented opposed to the other toes. While this conclusion would not necessarily be corroborated by subsequent specimens, the shape and position of the hallux led de Beer to conclude a perching, arboreal lifestyle for the animal.

==== Plumage ====
Flight feathers comprising primary remiges, secondary remiges, and tail rectrices are preserved on the London specimen, though no contour feathers are documented. The right wing shows better preservation than the left, though even here a precise arrangement of primaries and secondaries cannot be determined, instead appearing to emerge fan-like from a central area. The primaries and distal secondaries appear the same length, approximately 130 mm long. De Beer's original count of six primaries and ten secondaries is considerably less than the number documented in the later Berlin specimen. He also observed covert feathers above the base of the primaries, which show fine details of the barbs. He noted the similarity in shape and structure of these covert feathers to the original feather specimen described by von Meyer.

The tail shows completely preserved rectrices along each side of the long, bony tail. They are paired, with one feather on each side of each vertebra from the sixth caudal onward to the tip. The proximal five pairs are 60 mm in length, and increase strongly in size until reaching a maximum length of 120 mm at the eleventh caudal; here they begin decreasing until a terminal length of 90 mm is reached at the tail tip.

== The Berlin specimen ==
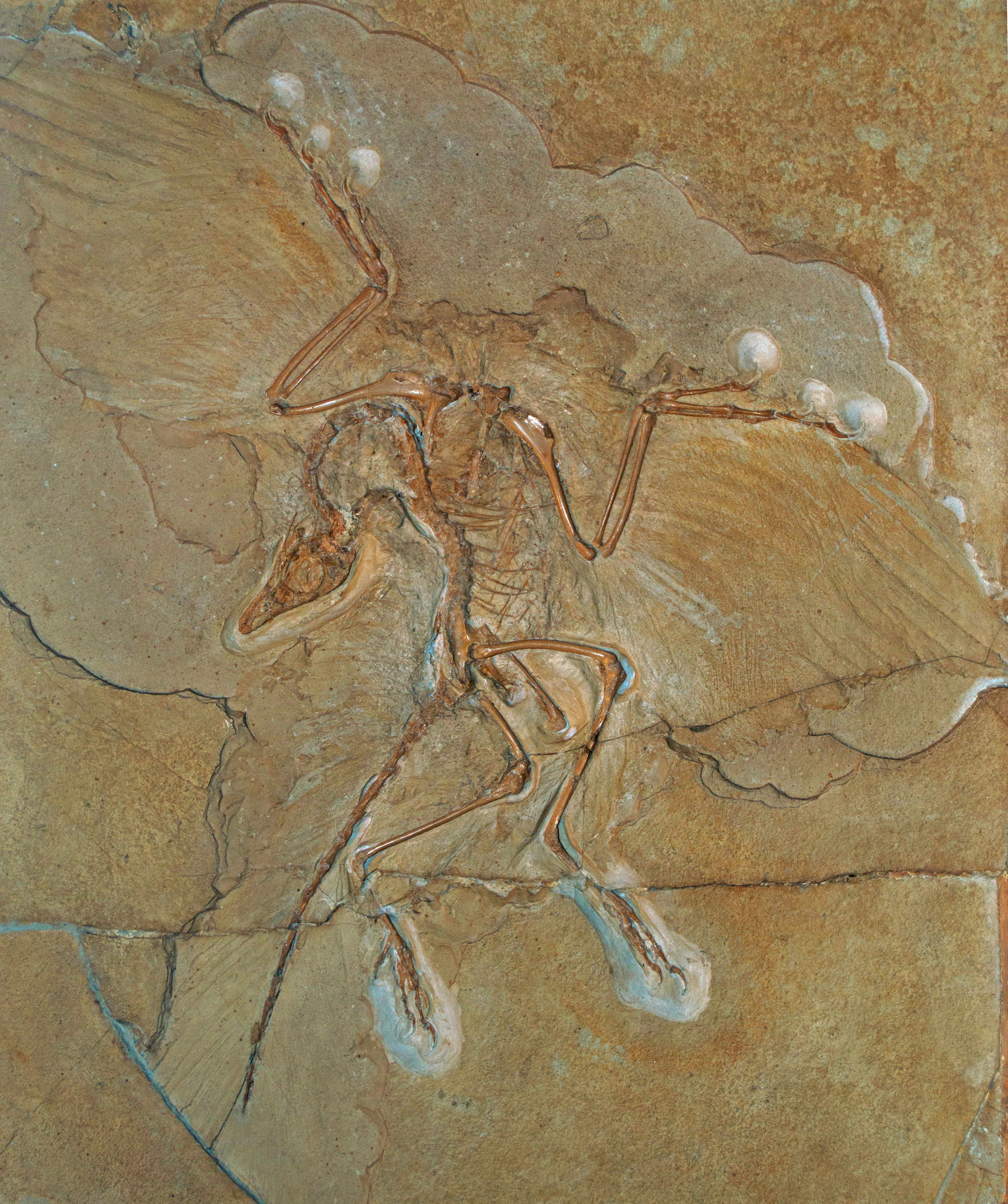
The Berlin specimen

The Berlin Specimen (MB.Av.101) was discovered in 1874 or 1875 at the Blumenberg quarry near Eichstätt, Germany, by farmer Jakob Niemeyer, who reportedly sold the fossil for the money to buy a cow around a year later, to inn-keeper Johann Dörr, who again sold it to Ernst Otto Häberlein, the son of K. Häberlein. Placed on sale between 1877 and 1881, with potential buyers including O.C. Marsh of Yale University's Peabody Museum, it was eventually bought by the Natural History Museum of Berlin, where it is now displayed, for 20,000 Goldmark. The transaction was financed by Ernst Werner von Siemens, founder of the famous company that bears his name. Described in 1884 by Wilhelm Dames, it is the most complete specimen, and the first with a complete head. It was named in 1897 by Dames as a new species, A. siemensii; a 2002 evaluation supports the A. siemensii species identification.

=== History ===
==== Discovery and purchases ====
With the London specimen now owned by Great Britain, a second complete specimen, unearthed several years later, attracted a great deal of attention and subsequent conflict in Germany. After its private purchase by Häberlein, its first public mention was in the journal "Leopoldina", shortly followed by a blurb in the newspaper "Neues Jahrbuch", both in May 1877. In the "Neues" it appeared under the heading "Petrefaktenhandel" ("fossil trading"), where it was listed for sale by Häberlein—as a pterosaur—along with his collection of (actual) Solnhofen pterosaurs.

A precise date for the specimen's original discovery is unknown, but is estimated at being sometime between as early as 1874 and autumn of 1876, shortly before its hand-off from Dörr to Häberlein. There is some conflict in reports of its year of discovery. Tischlinger (2005), for example, claims an 1874 or 1875 discovery for the fossil, some time before its purchase by Häberlein. Similarly, the fossil's original price is a matter of contradicting and speculative reports. Suggestions range from 140 marks, 1,400 marks, to 2,000 marks. Wellnhofer (2009) even mentions, based on a statement by quarry-owner Jakob Niemeyer's great-granddaughter, that only Häberlein knew the real value of the specimen and had purchased it pretending it was a pterosaur.

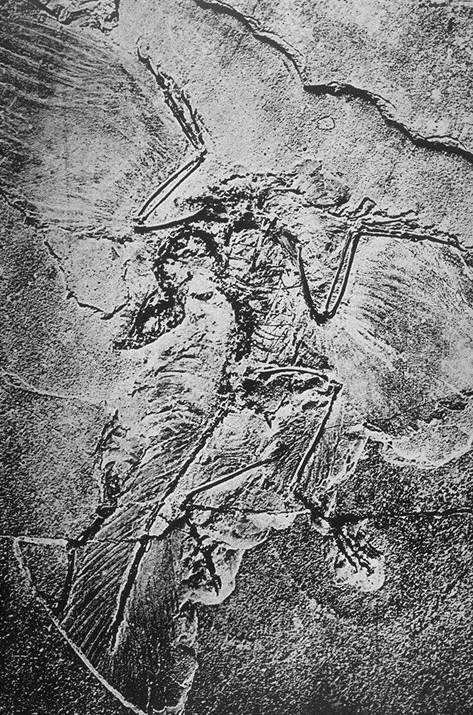
1880 photo of the Berlin specimen, showing leg feathers that were removed subsequently, during preparation

The original preparation of the specimen, exposing just part of the tail, was performed by Ernst Häberlein, who purchased it still mostly covered by matrix. This likely explains its misidentification as a pterosaur, despite its now-clear skeleton and feather impressions. After exposing these unique features, Häberlein first offered the specimen to the Bavarian State Paleontological Collection at a selling price of 15,000 guldens, equivalent to 25,710 marks. The State collection was unable to raise the money and the Bavarian parliament would not authorize the expenditure, despite the efforts of the then-acting director of the State collection, Karl Zittel, who passionately described the "faultless beauty" of the exposed tail alone.

One of the first early offers for the fossil came from O. C. Marsh of the Yale Peabody Museum in America, who offered up 1,000 deutschemarks for the fossil. This offer was refused by Häberlein and was followed by a significant counteroffer of $10,000 by F. A. Schwartz of Nürnberg. There is no evidence that Marsh was interested in negotiating further, and historians speculate that this may be due to Marsh's suspecting the fossil might be a fraud, following claims of such in a Nürnberg newspaper.

At this point, Häberlein offered to sell the fossil to the British Museum of London through a letter addressed to Director of the Geology Department G. R. Waterhouse, who had negotiated with Häberlein's father for the first specimen. This time, however, Waterhouse delayed the potential transaction and sought to negotiate the price, likely due to the specimen's having not yet been fully prepared. Häberlein tried the following year to sell the specimen to King's College London at the price of 1,600 pounds—more than twice what his father had sold the first specimen for—with no success. Meanwhile, he continued to work at preparing the fossil, albeit "extremely erratically, crudely and amateurishly". By 1877 he had reassembled the negative impressions on the counter slab, revealing the whole skeleton and the plumage of its spread wings and tail on the main slab. Now that the completeness and beauty of the fossil was on full display, Häberlein began asking for 36,000 marks for its sale, a price unable to be raised by any museum in the world.

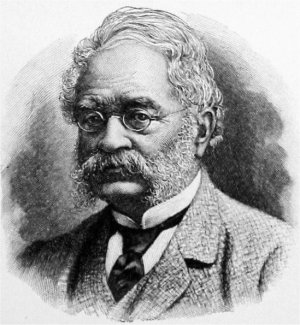
Ernst Werner von Siemens, the famous industrialist who financed the transaction of the Berlin specimen

As German representatives became increasingly desirous of the valuable fossil, intercessions with the German emperor as well as the king of Bavaria were attempted and ultimately failed. This failure incensed the professor of geology at the University of Geneva, Carl Vogt, who remarked that the emperor "would have agreed to an acquisition of the specimen, if it had been a cannon or a petrified gun". This statement was interpreted in Germany as a treasonous insult, especially given its subsequent publication in a French journal. At this point Häberlein was attempting to sell his fossil to museums in Munich, Berlin and Geneva; for this purpose he approached Vogt and reduced his price to 26,000 marks, a price still unaffordable by the Geneva museum.

In 1880, Häberlein wrote to the Mineralogical Museum of the Friedrich-Wilhelms University in Berlin in another attempted sale, at the "greatly reduced price of 26,000 marks". Museum director Ernst Beyrich traveled to meet Häberlein and inspect the fossil in spring of March 1880. Despite his urgent recommendation for its acquisition, the requisite funds could not be produced. It was only through the intervention of renowned German industrialist Werner von Siemens, founder of the Siemens engineering company, that the specimen was finally acquired for the Berlin museum. Von Siemens, who learned of the specimen and its problems reaching a sale through museum curator Wilhelm Dames, proposed to simply buy the fossil himself and then permit the fossil to enter custody of the paleontological collection of Friedrich Wilhelm University (the Berlin University, which in the present day is named "Humboldt University of Berlin" since 1949). After several years of tension, the fossil was finally reclaimed by Germany for a sum of 20,000 marks in April 1880, whereby von Siemens made it immediately available for research by the Mineralogical Museum of Berlin.

==== Historical reviews ====
University of Geneva geology professor Carl Vogt was the first individual to express interest in committing the specimen to scientific study. His original attempts, however, were committed before the specimen had been secured by a scientific institution and was still in the possession of physician Karl Häberlein. While Häberlein struggled to sell the specimen, Vogt endeavored to examine and publish a scientific study on the specimen, despite Häberlein's agreement to not allow anyone to produce a cast, duplication, drawing or photograph of the fossil. Vogt nevertheless published a photograph of the specimen entrusted to him by Häberlein in the Berlin journal "Naturforscher" in September 1879, the first published photo of the fossil. He later published on the specimen in several papers in Germany, Switzerland, England and France, as well as presenting the specimen at a Swiss naturalist meeting in 1879.

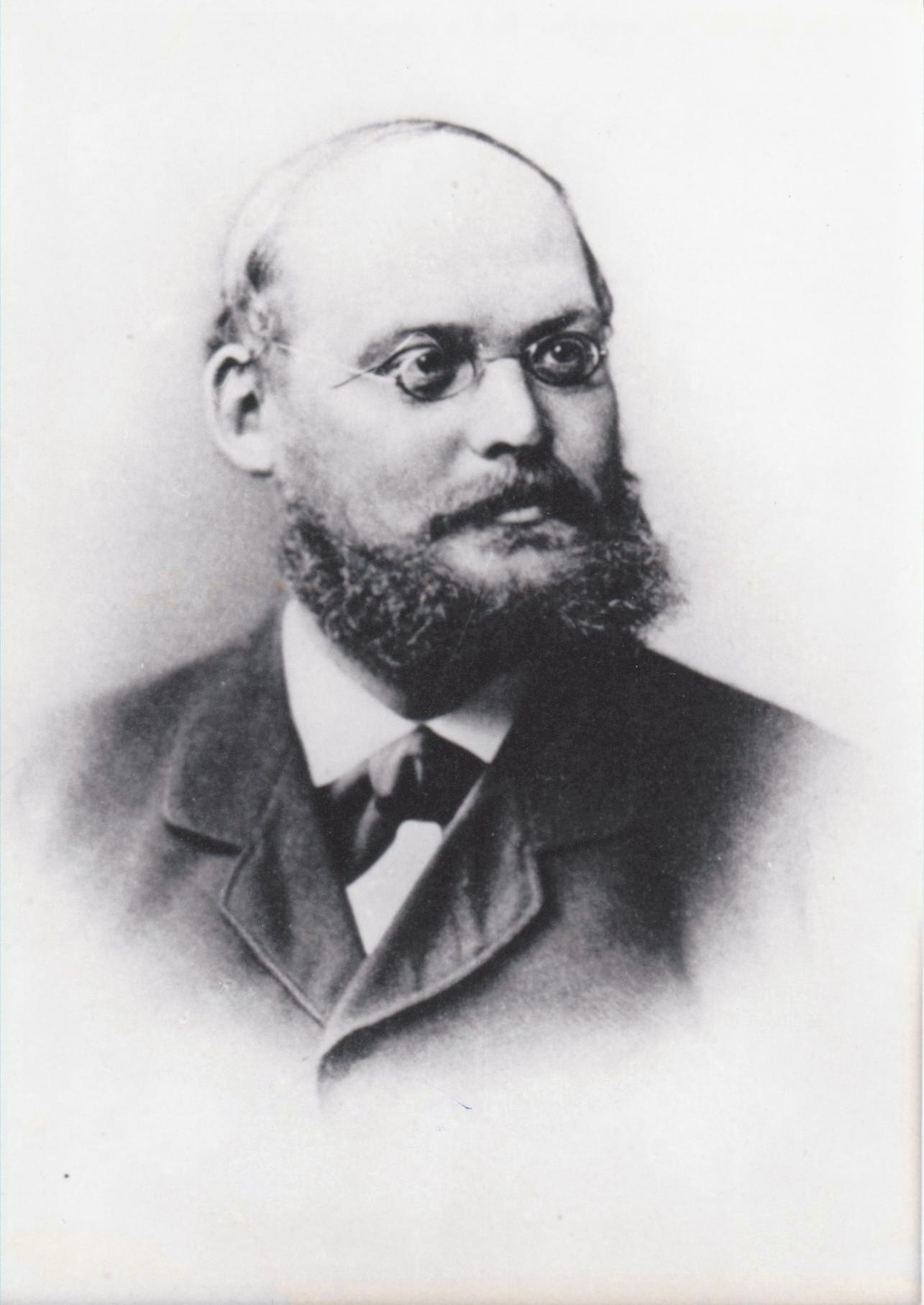
Prof. Wilhelm Barnim Dames

Despite the shortcomings of these early attempts, Vogt was notable in that his passionate defense of evolutionary theory, much in line with Thomas Huxley's earlier predictions about dinosaurs and birds, was largely on the mark with respect to Archaeopteryx's role in the evolution of birds. Working from the Berlin specimen, Vogt described the genus as a "flying reptile furnished with bird's feathers" and neither a bird nor a reptile, but an "intermediate link between both." Nevertheless, he also incorrectly predicted Aves as a paraphyletic taxon in which ratites evolved from dinosaurs and flying birds from Archaeopteryx. Many of these early conclusions were refuted by London paleontologist Harry Govier Seeley in 1881, who believed the animal to be a true bird. Seeley also originally posited that the Berlin specimen may represent a separate species from the London specimen, based on a comparison of skeletal measurements between the two.

Famous paleontologist Othniel Charles Marsh of Yale had the opportunity to study both the London and Berlin specimens in 1881. He described his findings in a meeting of the British Association for the Advancement of Science in York, England, where he reported previously unnoticed features of the fossils including real teeth. Marsh, like Seeley, defended the animal as representing a real bird, albeit the most reptilian one known. Geologist John Evans also studied the fossil in 1881, and observed that the feathers on the hind limbs of the animal appear to have the same structure as those on the wings and may have acted as lifting structures in flight. This idea later formed the basis for American zoologist William Beebe's prediction that a four-winged ancestor played a pivotal role in avian evolution.

Museum curator Wilhelm Dames was responsible for the first full scientific description of the Berlin specimen. Prior to this substantial monograph of 1884, Dames had already published a few shorter articles about the skull morphology while it was still partially covered by matrix. Now that the specimen was under his control and fully exposed, his subsequent study and monograph was the first comprehensive description of an Archaeopteryx specimen that had not been disarticulated.

=== Specimen ===
The Berlin specimen of Archaeopteryx is to date the most complete existing specimen of this genus, and is widely regarded as one of the most beautiful fossils in the world. Its well-preserved skeleton and the preserved feathers of its wings and tail have made it of considerable interest to a wide range of scientific study, beginning with Wilhelm Dames and Carl Vogt shortly following its discovery.

This iconic fossil preserves the animal with an articulated skeleton, complete skull and lower jaw, and spread wings with excellently preserved feather imprints. The three fingers of each hand are displayed with each claw oriented to the front, and the hind limbs are positioned to one side as though running. The bony tail is long, serially feathered, and slightly bent behind the pelvis. The main slab measures 46 cm by 38 cm and was broken into two unequal parts (visible today by a long crack). Due to Ernst Häberlein's inexpert attempts at mounting, the counter slab is relatively incomplete and shows only the negative molds of the bones and feather imprints.

==== Taphonomy ====
As is common among Solnhofen vertebrates, the neck and head of the Berlin specimen are highly recurved. The shoulder girdle has been displaced from the backbone by about 4 cm; this gives the specimen the illusion of having lower wings than it likely did in life. The natural articulation of humerus with the girdle's glenoid cavity reveals the wings of the living animal as having a more dorsal position.

Researchers believed the animal likely died by drowning in a Jurassic Solnhofen lake, floated on the surface for some time, and then sunk to the lagoon floor where it was deposited in calcium-rich mud. The specimen's exquisite preservation suggests a relatively short time in the lake before being deposited, perhaps on the order of hours or days.

==== Skull ====
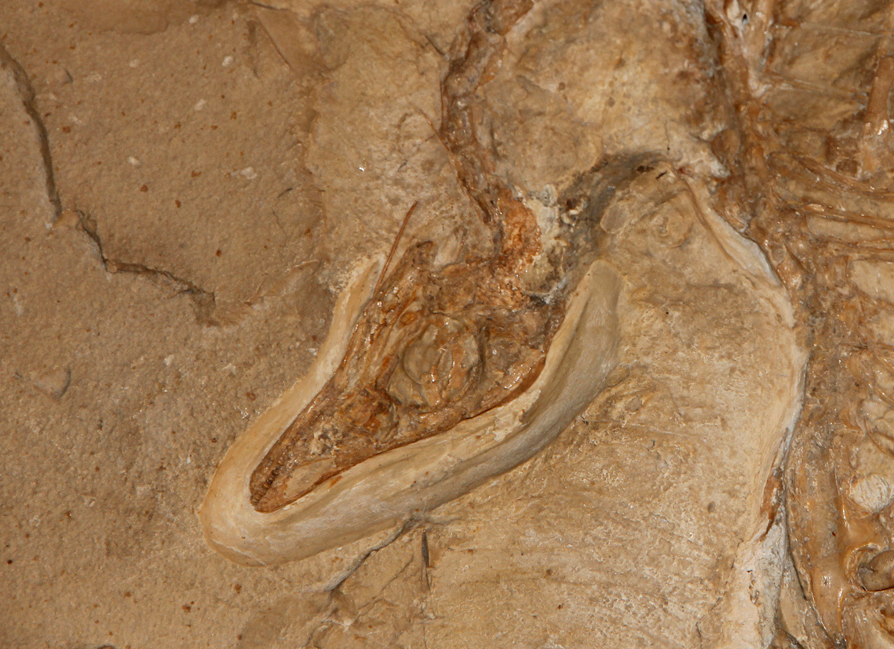
Detail of skull

While the London specimen included only a few fragments of the brain case and upper jaw, the Berlin specimen of Archaeopteryx has what appears at first glance to be an almost perfectly preserved skull. Closer inspection reveals the skull, while remarkable, to have considerable damage and defects, including compression and damage to the occipital region, which is partly missing. The mandible is so tightly pressed against the upper jaw that part of it is obscured by overlapping. The orbital (eye socket) has a diameter of 14 mm and includes a preserved scleral ring composed of 12 overlapping elements. Many smaller elements of the skull are distorted and their exact shape, position and size have historically been a matter of some debate. However, new techniques in ultraviolet imaging have revealed a more definitive nature of the skull's morphology.

Dentition analysis of the specimen shows twelve teeth on each half of the upper tooth row, likely four in the premaxillary and eight in the maxillary. The rostral teeth (near the tip) are longest and descend slightly in size towards the rear. Dames (1884) described the tooth shape as "cylindrical"; other authors have described their shape as peg-like, with curved tip and generally slender, having a smooth enameled surface and mostly oriented upright in the jaw. A slight constriction, or "waist", is visible about halfway between the root and the crown tip.

==== Trunk ====
Below the skull, the fossil shows a remarkable degree of articulation. The cervical vertebrae, for example, are all but one preserved in their natural pose. Analysis of these vertebrae led Dames to estimate a neck length of 60.5 mm. Later researchers postulated an additional vertebra and a slightly different measurement. This discrepancy is based on differing interpretations of the first two cervical vertebrae. Britt et al. (1998) observed lateral openings in these neck vertebrae and interpreted them as pneumatic foramina, suggesting a modern air sac system. The first eleven or twelve dorsal vertebrae bear ribs and these have a length between 5.5 and 7 mm with large neural spines. A sacral length of around 6.5 is deduced. Dames observed 20 caudal vertebrae; Wellnhofer posits 21. Dames also noted the similarity in the long, rod-like structures of the tail to those in the flying pterosaur Rhamphorhynchus, considering them to be ossified tendons. Thin, pointed cervical ribs begin at the third vertebra. The longest are about 50 mm and total eleven in number. Gastralia, or belly ribs, are arranged in 10 parallel rows and their position is suggested as evidence of post-mortem shrinking of the body. The scapulae are separated by about 17 mm and are flattened, narrow, and positioned much in their natural position. The coracoid, which comprises the other half of the pectoral girdle, is only well-preserved on the left side but shows a flattened, rectangular structure. Small fragments of the furcula are also identified, and as in other Archaeopteryx specimens this is a single boomerang-shaped structure.

Some controversy surrounded the sternum when first described. Dames (1897) first identified the triangular structure and Petronievics (1925) later attempted to reconstruct it as being keeled. The sternum identified in the London specimen, by contrast, appeared unkeeled and this discrepancy led Petronievics to classify the Berlin specimen as a different genus, Archaeornis. American paleontologist John Ostrom later identified the structure as part of the right coracoid based on X-ray photographs of this specimen. This claim was examined via UV technology and later rejected by Wellnhofer (1993) and Tischlinger & Unwin (2004), who reclassified it as part of the sternum, albeit minimally ossified (mostly cartilagenous). This supports the idea that the Berlin Archaeopteryx was not a full-grown individual at the time of its death, and instead represents an immature animal.

The pelvis of the Berlin specimen was considered by Dames to be markedly different from that of the London specimen, which was a major point in favor of his assigning a new species to the Berlin Archaeopteryx, siemensii, after its generous donor. Other researchers, however, disputed this difference, claiming it could be entirely accounted for by deformation of the specimens during preservation. Therefore, the Berlin specimen had at one point researchers arguing for both a separate genus and species name; Petronievics (1921) erected the genus Archaeornis and supported the claim that "Archaeornis siemensii" entirely lacked a pubic symphysis. De Beer continued to object that these differences were preservational, and that both specimens, while differing in size, possessed identical morphology, a conclusion generally accepted by later paleontologists.

==== Limbs ====
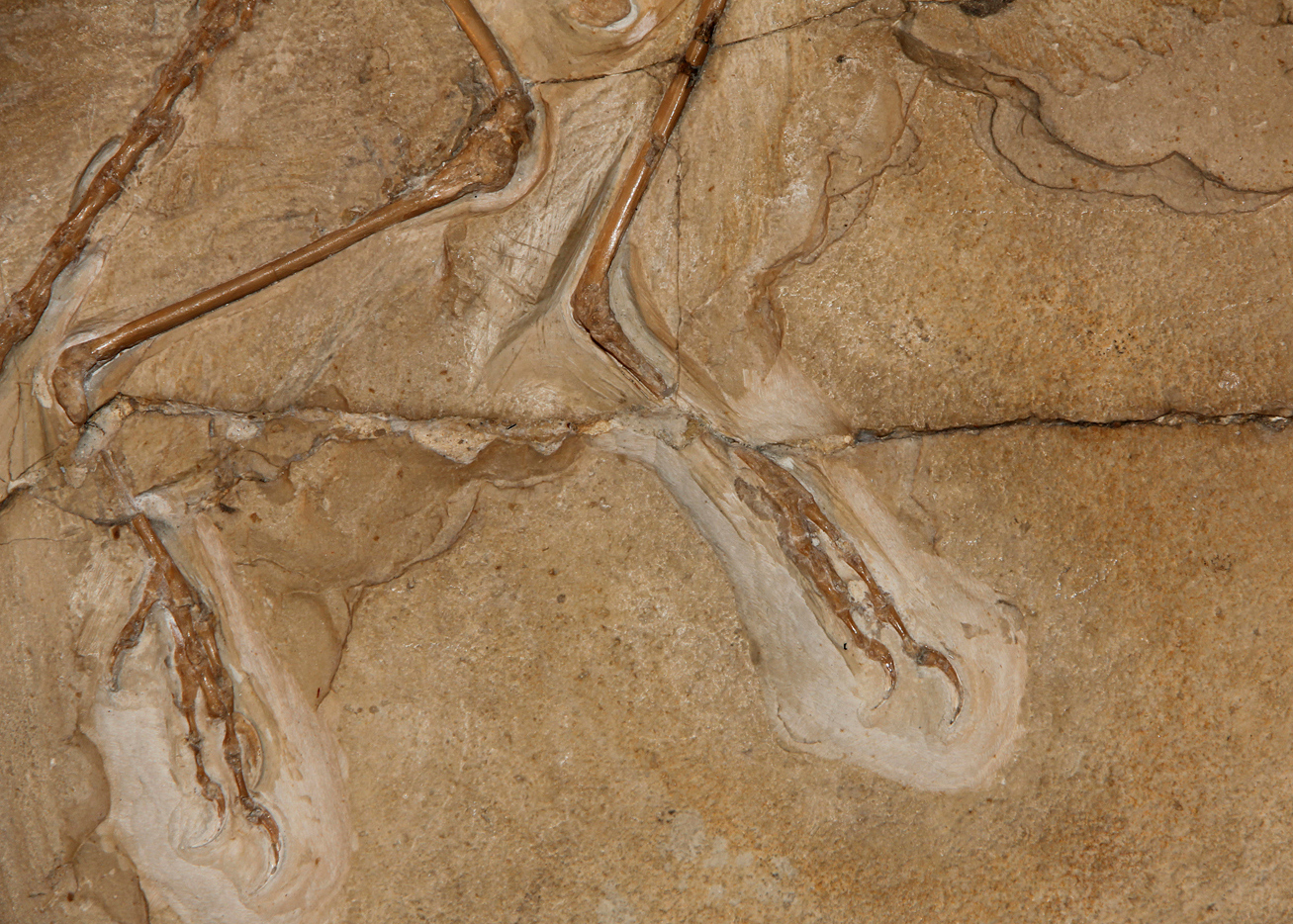
Detail of feet

The forelimbs of the Berlin specimen are among the best-preserved elements of the skeleton. Both arms are spread in dorsal view, still articulated with the shoulder socket. The articulated elbow joins upper and upper arm at a 45-degree angle; the wrist joins lower arm and manus at a 100-degree angle. While this element confused Dames originally, Petronievics eventually identified a large distal and smaller proximal carpal bone, which Danish paleontologist Gerhard Heilmann identified as a single fused bone. Today we recognize this bone as the semilunate carpal, after its half-moon shape. The hands of the Berlin specimen are beautifully preserved, and in contrast to the London specimen definitively showed the hands as three-fingered, rather than two-fingered. Though in close contact and oriented parallel to one another, the fingers are not fused as in modern birds. The first digit of the hand is the shortest, the second is the longest, and the third intermediate. The first digit appeared to be more mobile than the others. The position of the third digit, which overlapped with the second on both forelimbs, is likely to be a post-mortem displacement. The total length of the Berlin specimen forelimb is about 20 cm long, just over half the length of the entire nose-to-tail measurement of the animal.

Unlike the forelimbs, both hind limbs are preserved on the right side of the animal, reflecting a torsion of the animal's body upon preservation. The left femur is mostly hidden beneath the pelvis. Two muscle scars are visible on the femur, which John Ostrom compared to the trochanter major of modern birds as well as to theropod dinosaurs. The tibia is slender and straight, considerably longer than the femur, and has a longitudinal ridge where it contacts the fibula. The tarsals are relatively poorly preserved. The four-toed feet show a short, forward-pointing first digit and the curvature of the pedal claws is smaller than in the manual claws, though with larger flexor tubercles. The entire foot measures at about 75 mm in length. These hindlimb proportions agree roughly with those of the London specimen. The claw arc of the central pedal digit is about 120 degrees, which is close to the average for all Archaeopteryx specimens. This arc is also close to the average for that in perching birds and is well above the mean for ground-dwelling birds, despite conclusions against perching habits based on the short hallux and weak flexor tubercles.

==== Plumage ====
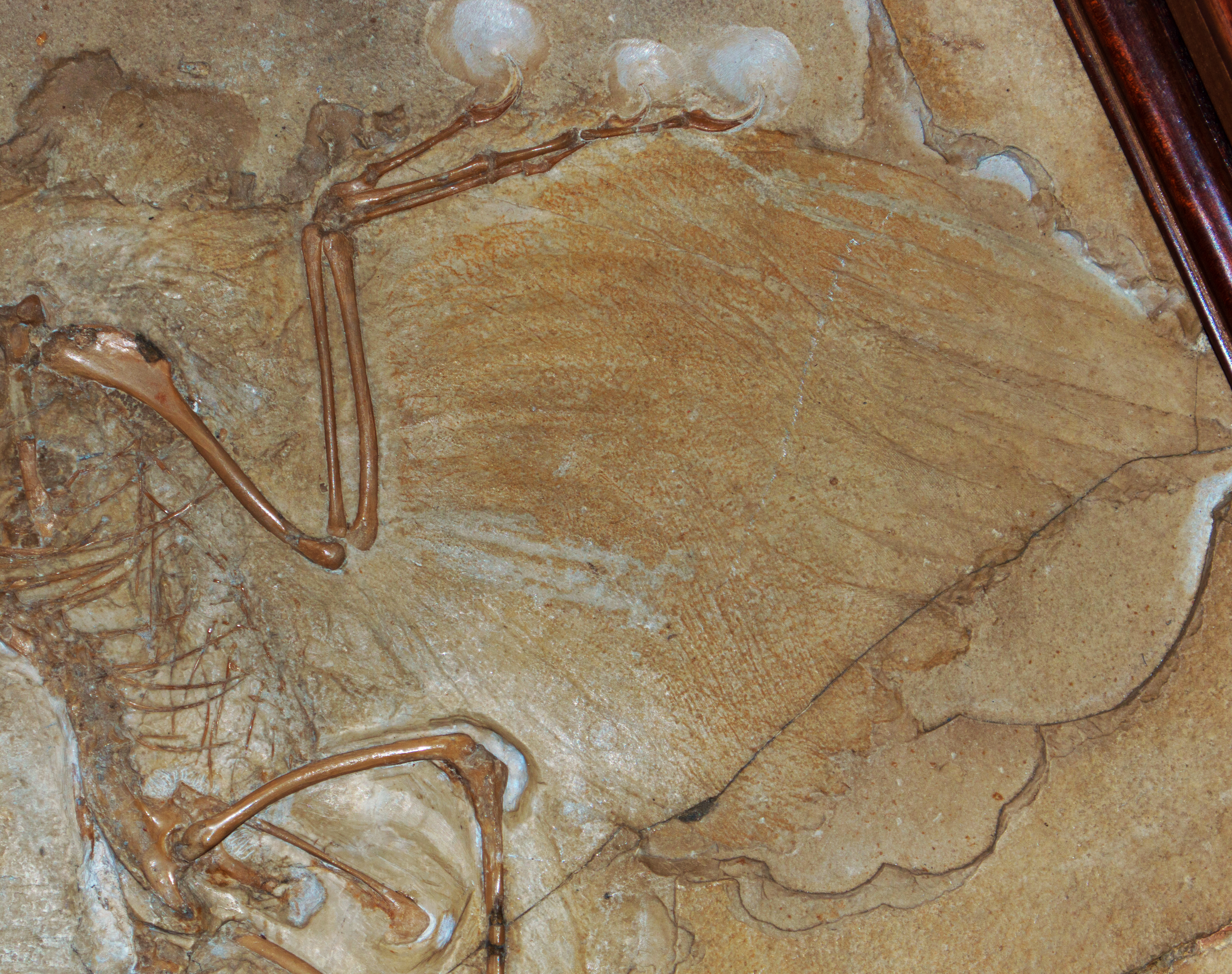
Detail of arm, hand and plumage

The remarkably preserved plumage is one of many features that sets the Berlin specimen apart from all other Archaeopteryx fossils to date. Clear feather impressions are visible on both wings, the tail, the lower legs, and the base of the neck. The feathers are likely to be preserved as molds and casts, rather than as imprints alone. Their preservation is unique: dubbed "relief-pseudomorphosis", the wings show the ventral surface of the feathers, with their negative mold on the main slab and their positive cast on the counter slab. This means the animal likely died on its back, showing the underside of its wings in preservation. As in birds, the primary remiges attach to the second digit of the manus at metacarpal II and phalanges. The secondary remiges are less distinctly preserved, attaching to the lower arm (ulna). Both sets of flight feathers are overlapping by extensive coverts. Some disagreement exists over the interpretation of the flight feathers, with some researchers claiming eleven primaries and others twelve. The distal primaries are asymmetrical, though the degree cannot be accurately measured due to overlapping, and range in length from 140 mm to 55 mm.

The feather preservation of rectrices along the long, bony tail is similar to that of the wings. These dorsoventral-oriented feathers have clearly defined barbs and comprise at least six pairs of short (45 mm) feathers to the proximal postsacral vertebrae, and another ten or eleven pairs of tail feathers with lengths up to 87 mm, which decrease in length up to the terminal vertebra.

The body feathers are described as being present at the base of the neck, on the back, and on the hind legs. The tibiotarsal feathers have been interpreted as similar to the feather "breeches" of birds of prey, and appeared at lengths from 25 mm up to 30–40 mm.

== The Maxberg specimen ==
Composed of a torso, the Maxberg specimen (S5) was discovered in 1956 near Langenaltheim; it was brought to the attention of professor Florian Heller in 1958 and described by him in 1959. It is currently missing, though it was once exhibited at the Maxberg Museum in Solnhofen. It belonged to Eduard Opitsch, who loaned it to the museum until 1974. After his death in 1991, the specimen was discovered to be missing and may have been stolen or sold. The specimen is missing its head and tail, although the rest of the skeleton is mostly intact. It takes its name from the Maxberg Museum, where it was exhibited for a number of years.

The Archaeopteryx specimen is, as of 2011, one of only 11 body fossils ever found, but has been missing since the death of its last known owner, Eduard Opitsch, in 1991. It is conventionally referred to as the third specimen.

=== History ===
==== Discovery and the first owner ====
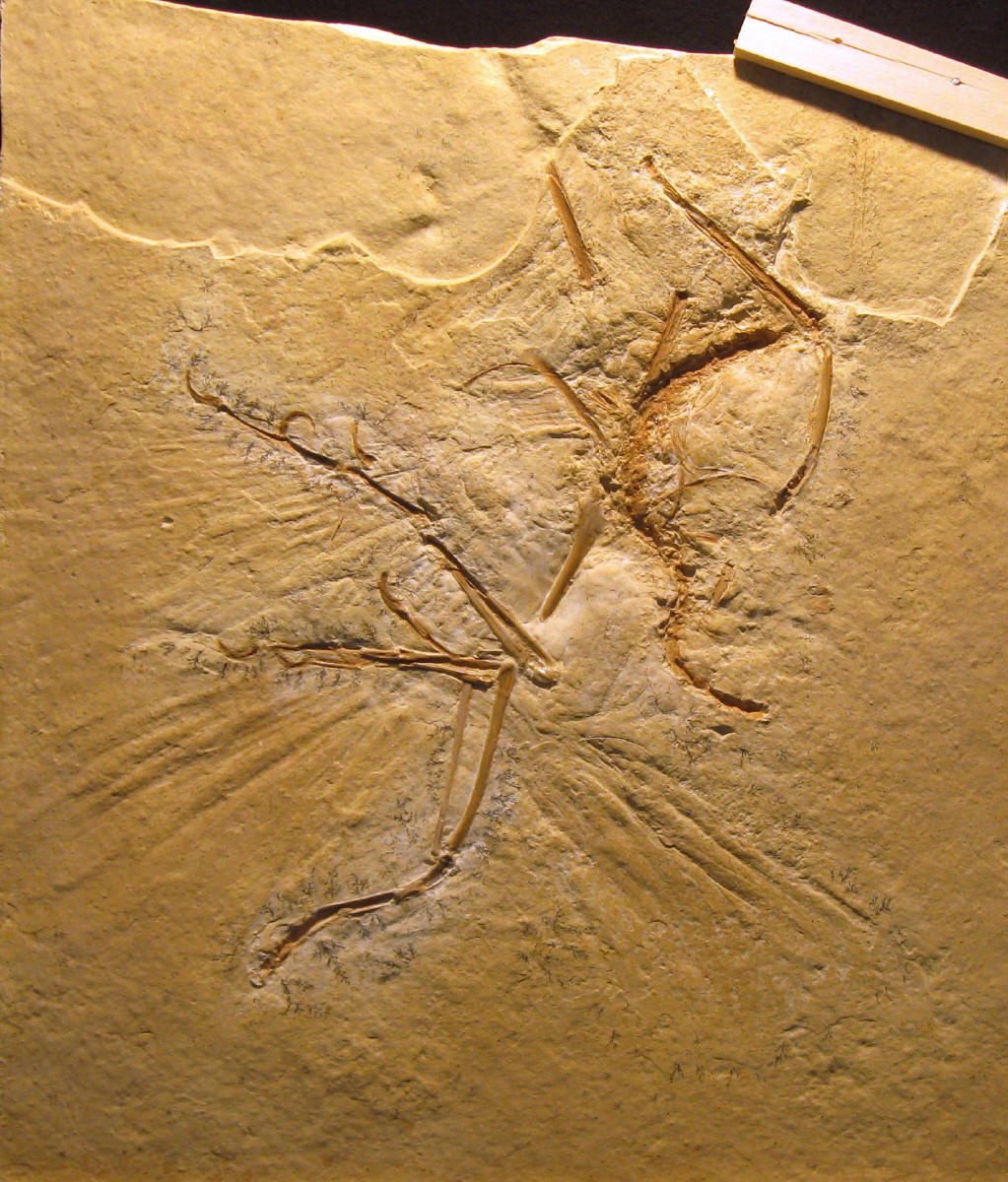
Cast of the Maxberg Specimen

The Maxberg specimen was discovered in 1956 by two workers, Ernst Fleisch and Karl Hinterholzinger, in a quarry between Solnhofen and Langenaltheim, Bavaria, eight decades after the previous discovery in 1874/1875, the Berlin specimen. The workers however did not recognise the significance of the find, mistaking it for an unimportant crayfish, Mecochirus longimanatus, and the pieces remained stored in a hut for the following two years.

In 1958, Eduard Opitsch, owner of the quarry, allowed the fossil to be taken away by visiting geologist Klaus Fesefeldt who believed it was some vertebrate and sent it to the University of Erlangen where paleontologist Professor Florian Heller identified it correctly and further prepared it. Opitsch, described by contemporaries as having had a difficult personality, attempted to sell the specimen to the highest bidder remarking: "if such things are found only once every hundred years, nothing will be given away for free". The Freie Universität Berlin offered 30,000 Deutschmark; in response the Bavarian institutions tried to preserve the specimen for their own Bundesland by outbidding them. In negotiations with Princess Therese zu Oettingen-Spielberg of the Bayerische Staatssamlung für Paläontologie und Geologie Opitsch, though never demanding an exact amount, had already vaguely indicated a price of about 40,000 DM. The BSP was willing to pay this but hesitant to compensate for the fact that any sum would be taxed at 40% as company profits. The tax collectors did not allow an exemption to be made for this special case. As a result, an irritated Opitsch in August 1965 suddenly broke off negotiations and declined all further offers.

==== Display and withdrawal ====
For a number of years, the find was displayed at the local Maxberg Museum. In 1974 Opitsch allowed high-quality casts to be made on the occasion of an exhibition by the Senckenberg Museum dedicated to Archaeopteryx, but immediately afterwards he removed it from public display altogether. Instead, he stored it in his private residence in nearby Pappenheim declining access to the specimen to all scientists. He rejected a proposal to further prepare the slabs.

Opitsch had become more defensive about the fossil after an announcement of another specimen in 1973. This was the Eichstätt specimen, which was much more complete and also transpired to have already been discovered in 1951, five years before the Maxberg. He felt that the large attention for this new specimen was intended to deprecate his own. Attempts were made to gain permission to show the specimen in exhibitions, but Opitsch always refused the requests. In 1984 Peter Wellnhofer, a renowned expert on Archaeopteryx, attempted to gather together all specimens and experts on the subject in Eichstätt but Opitsch ignored his request and the conference proceeded without the Maxberg specimen — the London and Berlin specimens however were absent too, the former because seen as too valuable by the British Museum of Natural History, the latter as it was about to be displayed in a surprise exhibition in Tokyo, together with a visit of the Berlin Brachiosaurus to Japan.

==== Disappearance ====
When Eduard Opitsch died in February 1991, the Maxberg specimen was not found in his house by his only heir, a nephew entering the building a few weeks after the death of his uncle who was the sole inhabitant. Witnesses claim to have seen the specimen stored under his bed shortly before he died. Opitsch's marble headstone at the cemetery of Langenaltheim depicts a gilded engraving modelled after the specimen, which led to the rumour that he had taken it to his grave. Another theory is that the specimen was sold secretly. The case of the lost specimen was even investigated by the Bavarian police after the heir reported it stolen in July 1991, but no further evidence of its whereabouts was found. Raimund Albersdörfer, a German fossil dealer who was involved in the 2009 purchase of the long-missing Daiting Specimen, believes, as do others, that the specimen is not lost but rather in private possession and will resurface eventually. As a result of all this, the specimen has no official inventory number.

The disappearance of the Maxberg specimen has led to renewed calls to protect fossil finds by law. The laws in this regard would be a matter of the federal states in Germany. Bavaria, to this date, is the only Bundesland having no laws protecting such finds. However, the federal government has declared the Maxberg specimen a national cultural heritage, national wertvolles Kulturgut, in 1995, meaning it cannot be exported without permission.

In 2009, the value of a high-quality Archaeopteryx specimen was estimated to be in excess of three million Euro.

=== Specimen ===
The Maxberg specimen, like all Archaeopteryx exemplars except the so-called "Daiting", shows body feathers. The specimen was formally described in 1959 by Florian Heller. Heller had roentgen and UV-pictures made by the photographic institute of Wilhelm Stürmer. The specimen consists of a slab and counterslab, mainly showing a torso with some feather impressions, lacking both head and tail. The roentgen pictures proved that parts of the skeleton still remained hidden inside the stone. Prior to its disappearance, several researchers had the opportunity to study the fossil including John Ostrom and Peter Wellnhofer. At this time, it was determined that further professional preparation of the fossil—which was still largely obscured by matrix—would expose a much greater extent of the skeleton to make available for research. Unfortunately, this was disallowed by Opitsch. To this day, any further research on the specimen must necessarily be conducted through a small number of relatively precise casts, photographs and X-ray images of both fossil slabs, which had been fortuitously made before its disappearance.

==== Taphonomy ====
The Maxberg specimen shows the greatest extent of disintegration among the Archaeopteryx body fossils, exemplified by its loss of skull, cervicals and parts of the hindlimb, indicating an extended period of transport before deposition on the lagoon floor. Both arms are preserved flexed unnaturally under one another, and the decayed rib cage had been separated and jumbled across the body. Apart from a large section of the vertebral column, most other elements of the skeleton were disarticulated upon preservation.

It was determined by a geologist that the quarry that produced the Maxberg specimen had also produced the London specimen, which was found almost one hundred years earlier, in 1861. However, the Maxberg example was found almost seven metres lower than the London one.

==== Skeleton ====
The vertebral column, parts of which are among the only articulated elements of the skeleton, is nevertheless too incompletely preserved for an exact vertebrae number to be estimated. Its original describer, Florian Heller, counted seven cervicals and five presumably fused sacrals. The left scapula, while badly damaged proximally, is in good condition distally; the right scapula is partly articulated with the coracoid at an almost right angle. The furcula is relatively well preserved, sitting close to its natural position and showing typical boomerang shape. All three components of the pelvic girdle—ilium, ischium and publs—are somewhat articulated in almost natural position.

Both forelimbs, though disarticulated, are mostly complete, including a completely exposed right humerus. The slightly curved ulna, like all Archaeopteryx specimens, lacks quill knobs in contrast to modern birds. No carpus elements are present, but the right manus is fairly well preserved and all three digits of the hand are separated and independent. All three fingers bear robust, strongly curved claws with well-developed flexor tubercles. An isolated horn sheath, indicating the keratinous outer surface of the claw in life, lies near the second finger of the left manus.

The left hindlimb is well preserved, and shows a femur, tibia with fibula, and vague foot skeleton; the right hindlimb preserves only an isolated tibia. Both hindlimbs are disarticulated from the pelvis. An isolated foot skeleton lies on the counter slab, probably the left. This shows the three unfused center metatarsals (II, III, and IV) lying in parallel, as well as initial fusion between tarsal and metatarsals. As in other specimens, this supports an incipient tarsometatarsus in Archaeopteryx, approaching the fully fused condition in modern birds.

==== Plumage ====
The Maxberg specimen preserves feather imprints covered by a thin sedimentary layer that obscures many fine details of the feathers. This may be a consequence of decay and disintegration on the lagoon floor. In the few feathers where detailed morphology can be observed, their structure appears identical to the plumage of other Archaeopteryx specimens. The left wing preserves the better plumage and shows flight feathers firmly connected to the arms. Though the wings overlap each other enough that assigning feather attachment points to individual bone regions is not possible, it does appear, consistent with other specimens and modern relatives, that the long primary feathers are attached to the second manual digit.

The feathers of the right wing are considerably more damaged; so many feathers are missing that only a few can be definitively linked to the ulna, designating them as secondary remiges. One small feather is isolated next to the right humerus, suggesting that the animal's feathers had fallen out prior to or shortly after decomposition. Numerous small feathers proposed to be coverts are observed next to the second metacarpal and the phalanges, partly overlapping the shafts of the flight feathers. Feather "breeches", similar to those observed in the Berlin specimen, are found around the tibial region.

== The Haarlem specimen ==
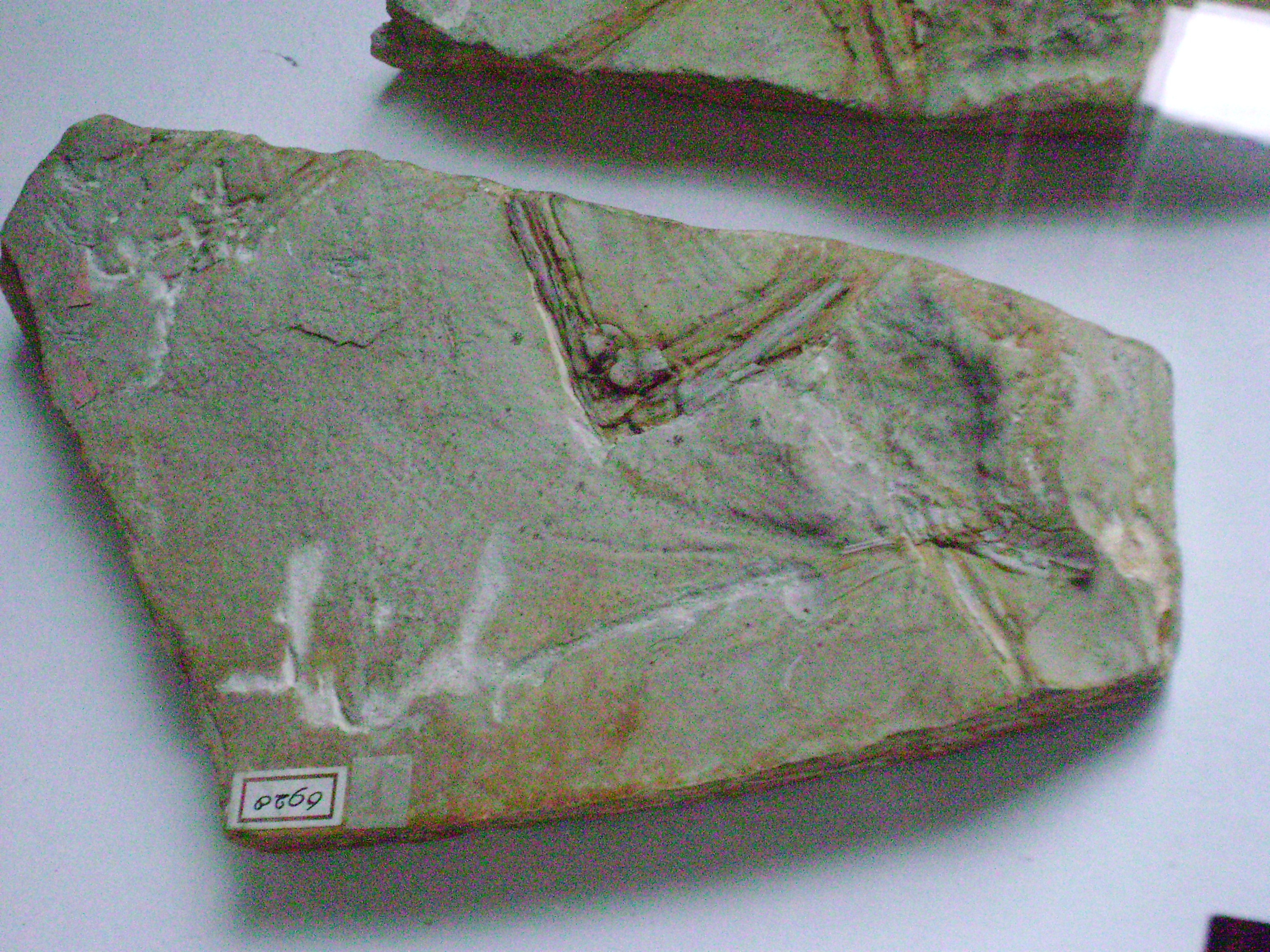
Slab of the Haarlem Specimen

The Haarlem Specimen (TM 6428/29, also known as the Teyler Specimen) was discovered in 1855 near Riedenburg, Germany and described as a Pterodactylus crassipes in 1857 by von Meyer. It was reclassified in 1970 by John Ostrom and is currently located at the Teylers Museum in Haarlem, the Netherlands. It was the very first specimen, despite the classification error. It is also one of the least complete specimens, consisting mostly of limb bones and isolated cervical vertebrae and ribs.

In 2017, paleontologists Christian Foth and Oliver Rauhut concluded that the specimen represented an animal more closely related to the Chinese Anchiornis and introduced the generic name Ostromia.

=== History ===
The commonly used names of this specimen come from the old Dutch city of Haarlem, as well as from the city's Teyler Museum, named for its founder Pieter Teyler van der Hulst. In the 19th century the museum acquired a huge number of fossils from Solnhofen, and between 1863 and 1868 it listed over 12,000 fossils in its paleontological collection. In March 1860, a seemingly unremarkable vertebrate fossil from Riedenburg, Bavaria, was purchased from von Meyer by the then-director of the Teyler Museum, Jacob Gijsbertus Samuël van Breda (Winkler 1865). This piece had been described in 1857 as belonging to the pterosaur Pterodactylus crassipes by H. v. Meyer (v. Meyer 1857), and the Teyler Museum displayed it as such for over a century.

In October 1966, Peter Wellnhofer visited the Teyler Museum to examine its collection of Solnhofen pterosaurs, disputing its assignment to P. crassipes. However, it was not until 8 September 1970 that the fossil was finally recognized as belonging to Archaeopteryx by John Ostrom, who was also at the time engaged in studying Solnhofen pterosaurs and was suspicious of the species assignment of this pterosaur. His reclassification of von Meyer's P. crassipes type specimen as an Archaeopteryx was published in Science in 1970 (Ostrom 1970), with a more thorough investigation of the specimen two years later in the Proceedings of the Royal Netherlands Academy of Sciences (Ostrom 1972b). In this way, the so-called fourth specimen of Archaeopteryx, preceded in the literature by the London, Berlin and Maxberg specimens, was in reality the first, discovered as it was originally in 1855—five years before the feather that would ultimately reveal the existence of avians in the Jurassic.

=== Specimen ===
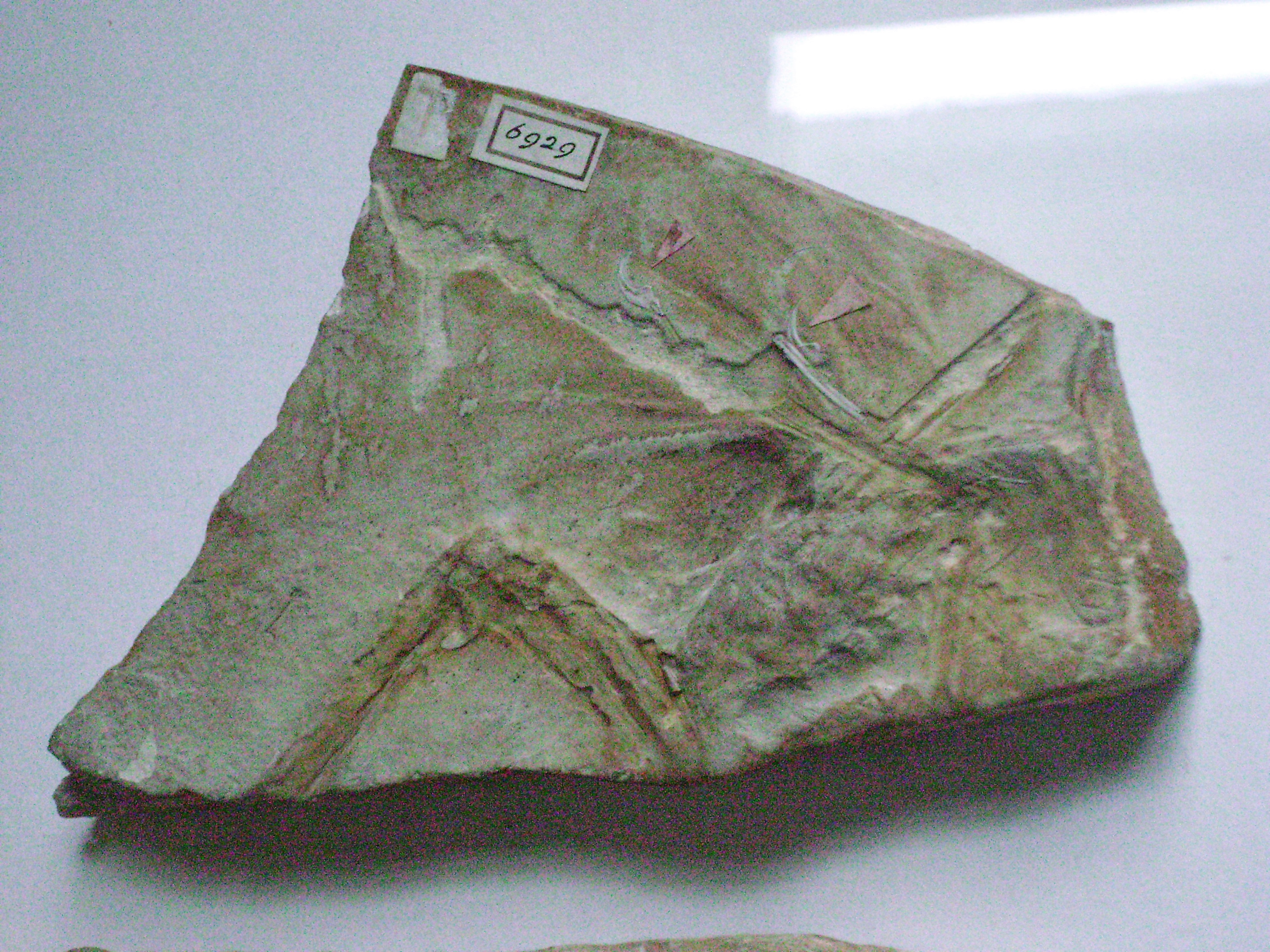
Opposite slab of the Haarlem specimen

Both slabs of the specimen display bone material and faint feather impressions, and together preserve the parts of the dorsal vertebrae and gastralia, a number of bones of the arms and especially the hand with all three fingers well-preserved, a small piece of the pelvic girdle, and substantial parts of both legs, most notably the feet which are also reasonably well-preserved, particularly the phalanges and metatarsus of the left foot. All pieces remain in original articulation and both slabs show relatively little decay.

==== Skeleton ====
While not one of the best-preserved Archaeopteryx fossils, a few of its skeletal elements are noteworthy. Its gastralia are exceptionally-well preserved, and the counter slab shows at least 14 of the slender, rib-shaped bones. Faint imprints of several dorsal vertebrae are also observed, and four actual rib fragments in articulation with the vertebrae. A single pelvic bone is preserved, the pubis, and displays the boot-shaped pubic symphysis.

The main slab preserves a significant portion of the left leg. Pieces of both femora remain, and a large part of the left femur is preserved in natural articulation at the knee with the lower leg, which preserves only the left tibia in proximal. The left fibula is preserved on the main slab, but the distal elements of the lower leg are broken off at the slab edge. The left metatarsus and foot are preserved only as faint impressions, but these are distinct enough to derive the pedal phalange formula 2-3-4-5-0 that is typical for the genus (Ostrom 1972b) The claw impressions are also relatively distinct and allow for comparison with the forelimb claws.

The forelimb preserves parts of the wing skeleton on the main slab, which displays the distal left humerus and both forearm bones. A bone that has been interpreted as a semilunate carpal may lie between the forearm and second metacarpal, but this remains inconclusive. The hand is fairly well-preserved and the first finger especially preserves the claw at its tip most exceptionally. This claw has a strong curvature, sharply pointed, has deep lateral furrows, and a stout tubercle at the base. The imprint of the horn sheath also remains, which shows a rounded thickening of the claw that tapers to a very sharp point. While otherwise not an exceptional specimen in many respects, the details of the hand provided previously-unknown details of the animal's claw morphology.

Apart from the plumage, it was many elements of the forearm preservation that allowed Ostrom to make the Archaeopteryx determination. For example, the narrow gap between radius and ulna, which is clearly observed in the Haarlem specimen, is a feature not known in pterosaurs (Ostrom 1972b).

=== Plumage ===
Although the specimen preserves faint plumage impressions, it is understandable why they escaped v. Meyer's notice in 1857—such structures as feathers were unknown from the Late Jurassic before 1860–61. Only in oblique light do the Haarlem specimen's feather imprints show up at all, and these originate from the left forearm, and therefore likely the imprints of the animal's secondary remiges. Some researchers have speculated at some obscure impressions on the specimen belonging to the primary feathers, but this has not been determined with certainty.

== The Eichstätt specimen ==
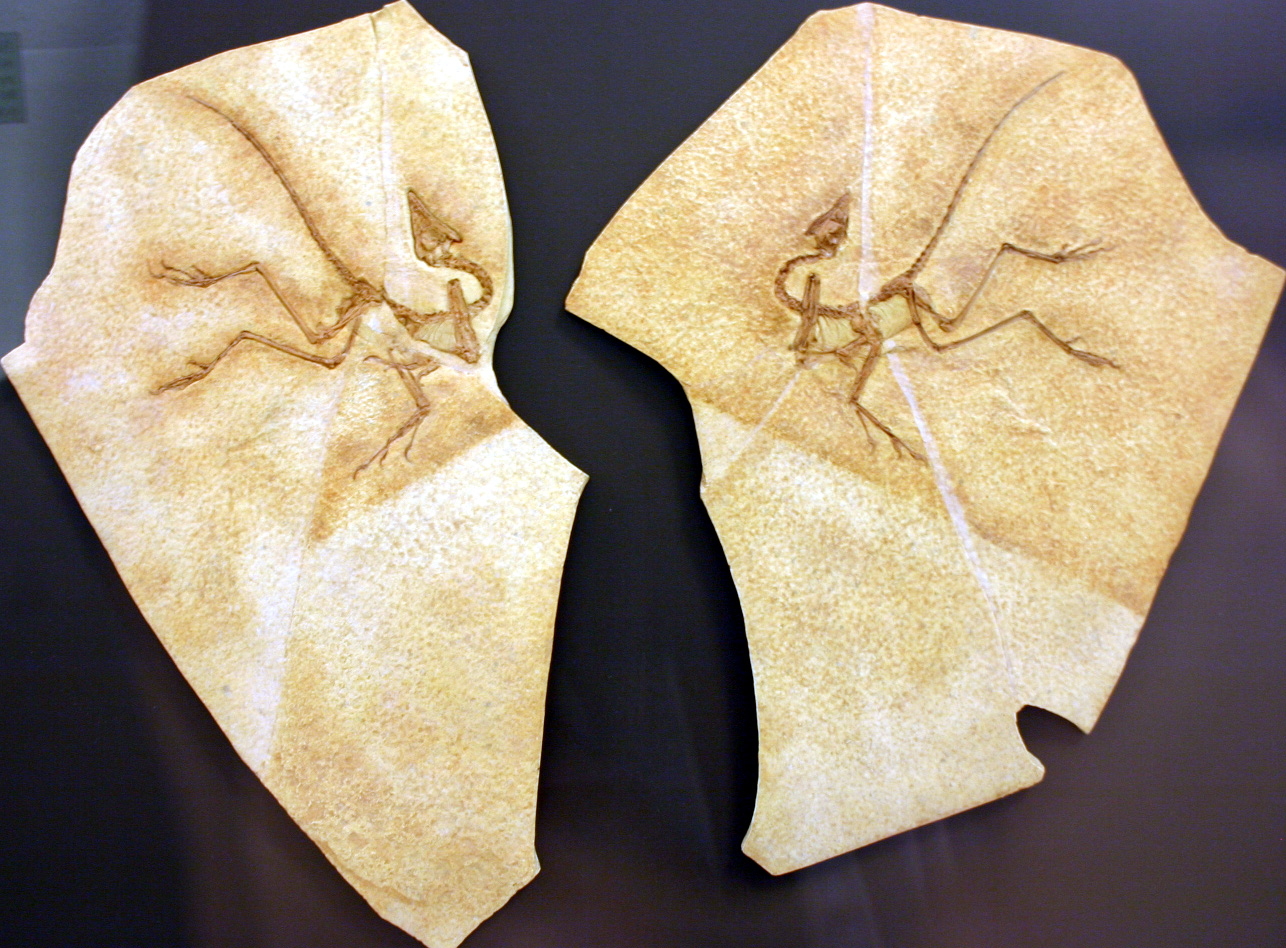
Slabs of the Eichstätt specimen

The Eichstätt Specimen (JM 2257) was discovered in 1951 near Workerszell, Germany and described by Peter Wellnhofer in 1974. Currently located at the Jura Museum in Eichstätt, Germany, it is the smallest specimen and has the second best head. It is possibly a separate genus (Jurapteryx recurva) or species (A. recurva).

=== History ===
More than 20 years passed between the discovery of the Eichstätt specimen and its description and publication in 1973. The most likely reason for this discrepancy can be traced to the preliminary description of the specimen by Franz Xaver Mayer, a German collector of Plattenkalk fossils and professor of several disciplines. In 1973, he wrote that he came into possession of the fossil after a series of extremely intricate and protracted negotiations with Xaver Frey of Workerszell, who owned the fossil prior to Mayer's bringing it to the Jura Museum in the Willibaldsburg. Wellnhofer later reconstructed the probable course of events. Xaver Frey had in 1951 offered the piece for sale as a pterosaur specimen. Mayer, a priest and conservator of the fossil collection of the Eichstätt seminary, had at first identified it as a rare Compsognathus exemplar, buying the fossil at an elevated price. On further preparation however, he discovered that it was a priceless Archaeopteryx specimen. Although the sale was in principle valid despite the error, as a priest Mayer felt a moral obligation to allow Frey to rescind on the deal. But Mayer knew that his institute could never afford to acquire such an expensive object and he feared it would be lost to science. Unable to solve this moral dilemma, he stored the specimen in his safe. In 1965, Frey had deceased. In 1972, Mayer, himself already eighty-four years old, on the occasion of the opening of a new Eichstätt natural history museum, invited Peter Wellnhofer to examine the specimen and publish a scientific analysis. Frey's heirs were financially compensated. The specimen was displayed for a time at the Frankfurt Senckenberg Museum, and in 1974 both slabs were transferred to the newly opened Jura Museum in Eichstätt, where it remains.

==== Investigation and Analyses ====
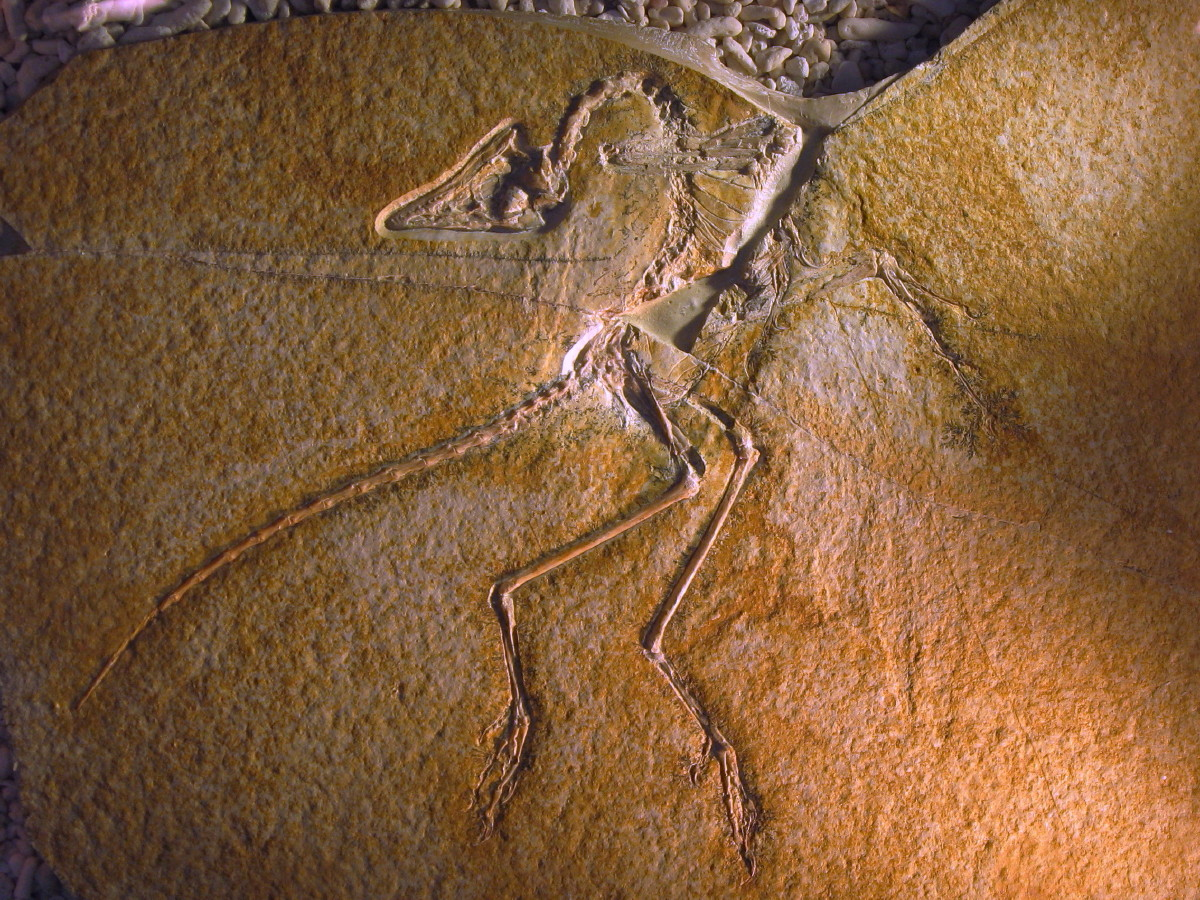
Close up of a slab

The first documented preparation of the specimen was carried out in 1972 (Tischlinger 1973), and further studies were conducted under the supervision of Wellnhofer at Munich's Paleontological State Collection in 1973, and of the skull by the Jura-Museum's preparator, Pino Völkl, in 1989 (Völkl 1989). X-ray photographs were additionally taken prior to any public announcement of the specimen, including some which involved innovative methods of image processing (Stürmer 1983). Some of these were later built upon by Johannes Mehl in his subsequent analyses of the fossil, including by stereo images, ultraviolet light, and other techniques (Mehl 1998, Vieser 1988).

=== Specimen ===
The Eichstätt specimen of Archaeopteryx is represented by an almost-complete skeleton visible on both slab and counter-slab, though the majority of the skeleton is on the main (overlying) slab. The animal is preserved lying on its right side, as in the Berlin specimen. The specimen is in almost complete articulation with many items in their original positions. The vertebral column, which had become strongly recurved in death, enabled the animal's head to lie above the pelvis in near-perfect preservation. This excellently preserved skull is one of the most notable features of this specimen.

==== Skeleton ====
The majority of the Eichstätt specimen's noteworthy status comes from its beautifully preserved skull, which has been analyzed in depth by Wellnofer (1974) and later by Elzanowski & Wellnhofer (1996). The skull is laterally compressed but single bones are nonetheless distinguishable. Among other things the skull presents evidence of a certain extent of cranial kineses by way of a preserving an articular surface on the ventral side, showing that sliding movements were possible between the lacrymal and jugal.

== The Solnhofen specimen ==
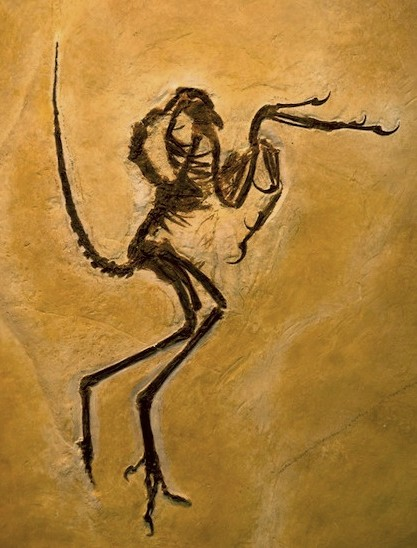
The Solnhofen specimen

The Solnhofen Specimen, inventory number BMM 500, was probably discovered in the 1960s near Eichstätt, Germany and described in 1988 by Wellnhofer. Currently located at the Bürgermeister-Müller-Museum in Solnhofen, it was originally classified as Compsognathus by an amateur collector, the same burgomaster Friedrich Müller after which the museum is named. Müller acquired it in a completely unprepared state from some anonymous fossil dealer. It is the largest specimen known and may belong to a separate genus and species, Wellnhoferia grandis. It is missing only portions of the neck, tail, backbone, and head.

=== History ===
The Solnhofen specimen was originally thought to be a Compsognathus by Friedrich Müller, the former Bürgermeister of Solnhofen whose private collection it resided in until it was examined on 11 November 1987 by Peter Wellnhofer and Günter Viohl, the then-Director of the Jura Museum, during an appraisal of the collection, about to be sold to the Bürgermeister-Müller-Museum. Mr. Müller had already prepared the fossil, and granted permission to Wellnhofer for the study and publication of the new specimen. The fossil was transferred to Munich in 1987 and then officially introduced to the public at a Solnhofen press conference on 14 July 1988.

The Solnhofen specimen became the center of an ownership litigation issue in the fall of 1988, when an Eichstätt quarry owner, Franz Xaver Schöpfel, claimed that the specimen had in fact in 1985 been found by one of his workers in the Wintershof area of the quarry. The fossil was then, Schöpfel claimed, sold by the worker to the private collector instead of respecting his ownership. As such, Schöpfel charged two of his workmen with embezzlement, as well as Mr. Müller as a fencer. After being delayed until 1994, the case was finally thrown out for lack of evidence, analysis of the stone structure of the piece showing that it differed from the Wintershof layers.

However, in 1995 the plaintiff then sued the community of Solnhofen to recover the fossil, presenting testimony from private collectors claiming to have been offered the specimen, and eventually the Landgericht Ansbach (a "District Court") ordered the specimen returned in 1998. The community of Solnhofen objected to this decision and the case went to the Oberlandesgericht Nürnberg (the Superior District Court of Bavaria) in 2001, where it was overturned in favor of the community. This in turn was objected to by the quarry owner, who brought the case to the highest level of the Federal Court of Justice in Karlsruhe, which upheld the Superior District Court's decision in 2003, bringing a 14-year lawsuit to a close and earning the sixth Archaeopteryx specimen its name of Solnhofen.

=== Specimen ===
The Solnhofen specimen represents the largest unequivocal Archaeopteryx individual known. It is represented by a nearly-complete skeleton on a plate sized 39 x 52 cm. There is no counterslab associated with this specimen.

The skeleton shows a death posture typical of theropods and especially similar to that of the Eichstätt specimen. The animal's carcass was likely deposited and buried completely articulated. Despite the specimen's skeletal completion, plumage traces are very faint and scarce on the fossil. Some suggestions of slightly curved, parallel structures lie between the left lower arm and the right upper leg, likely to represent the secondary feathers of the left wing.

The specimen's skull is discernible only from the anterior portion and several pieces of the mandible; the rest seems to be missing, crushed or fragmented. Four premaxillary and seven maxillary teeth are preserved. Only a few remains of cervical and dorsal vertebrae are preserved, though the last four dorsals remain articulated and fifteen caudals are present, suggesting a significantly missing tail tip (the London specimen, by contrast, had 23 caudals); this missing tip had by Müller been incorrectly restored on the slab. Elongated, rod-like structures along the tail from the fifth caudal onward suggest a stiff tail that was chiefly flexible at the base. Ten pairs of dorsal ribs are preserved, and like previous specimens lack uncinate processes. An unfused scapula and coracoid remain in close contact, and the presence of a furcula, contrasted against the lack thereof in smaller specimens, suggests that ossification of this bone is age-related.

Both wings are naturally articulated, with only the wrist area of both hands missing. The three digits of the right hand are positioned similarly to the Berlin, Eichstätt and Maxberg specimens, with the third digit crossing underneath the second—a condition suggested by Kemp & Unwin (1997) to reflect post-mortem displacement. The legs are similarly well-articulated, robust, and arranged similarly to those of the Munich specimen. The toes of the right foot are completely preserved, and the aberrant phalangeal formula reads 2-3-4-4-0 rather than 2-3-4-5-0 as in other specimens. The reason for this discrepancy is not known, and cannot be checked against the left foot, which is missing critical elements. Suggestions include an aberrant anomaly (Wellnhofer 1988b, 1992a) or a taxonomically significant character (Elzanowski (2001b).

== The Munich specimen ==
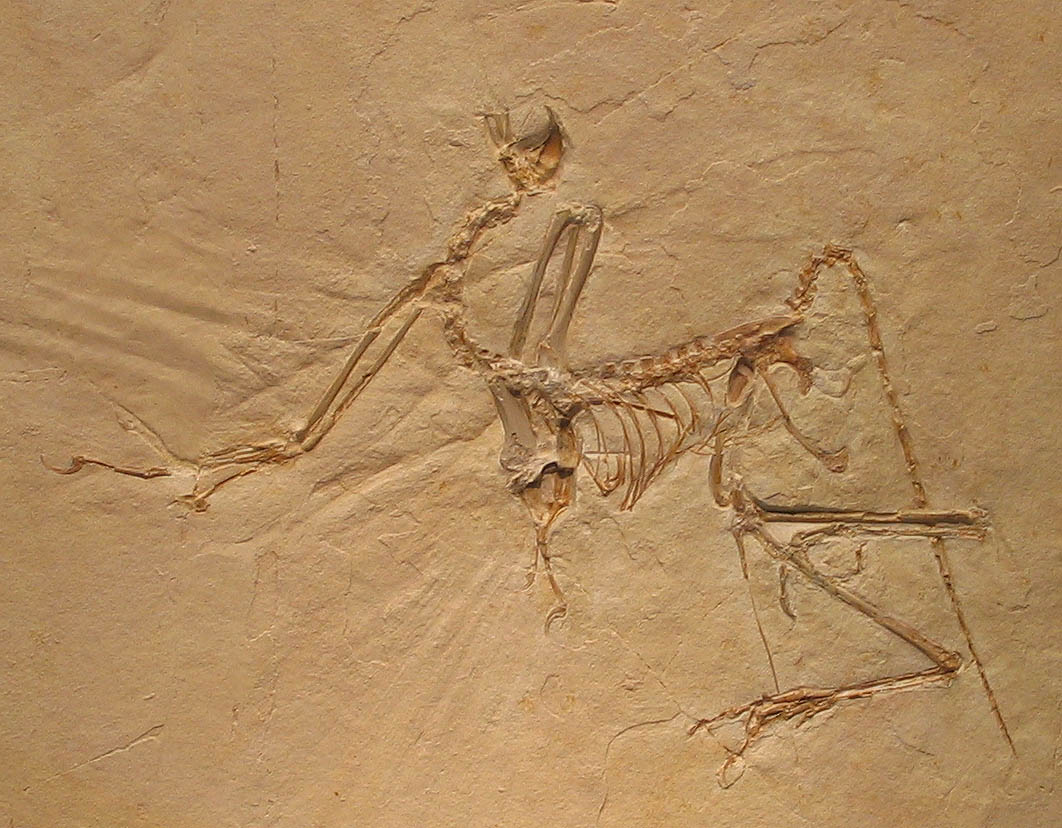
The Munich specimen

The Munich Specimen (BSP 1999 I 50, formerly known as the Solenhofer-Aktien-Verein Specimen) was discovered on 3 August 1992 near Langenaltheim and described in 1993 by Wellnhofer. It is currently located at the Paläontologisches Museum München in Munich, to which it was sold in 1999 for 1.9 million Deutschmark. What was initially believed to be a bony sternum turned out to be part of the coracoid, but a cartilaginous sternum may have been present. Only the front of its face is missing. It may be a new species, A. bavarica.

=== History ===
In August 1992, this specimen was unearthed piecemeal in the limestone quarries of Langenaltheim by Jürgen Hüttinger, who was working in the quarry under the auspices of the stone company Solenhofer Aktien-Verein. Hüttinger first found a small fragment of stone showing a few fossil bones, and was able to collect all fragments of the layer and fit them together like a puzzle. He was initially under the impression it was a pterosaur until noticing a few traces of feather imprints on the surface of the collected fragments.

The quarryman honestly informed the director of the quarry, who legally owned any finds by worker, and the next day Wellnhofer was called on to come examine the fossil and was asked to take over the scientific study of the new specimen. It was prepared in Munich by Wellnhofer's skilled preparator, Ernst Schmieja, in the Paleontological State Collection labs. When preparation of the fossil was completed in December of that year, Schmieja realized that only the tip of one wing was missing from the assembled stone fragments, and a frantic search amongst the half metric ton of saved slabs collected from the same layer finally revealed the missing fragment, to be placed as the final piece to complete the puzzle.

This seventh Archaeopteryx fossil has been the focus of many public events and attractions. In April 1993, the Munich specimen was the feature of a public press conference in Solnhofen, where it was highlighted by Bavarian journalists, radio and television companies. Later that year it went on exhibit on occasion of the 150th anniversary of the Bavarian State Collection in Munich. In 1997, the Chicago Field Museum featured it in a special exhibit titled "Archaeopteryx—the bird that rocked the world" for the annual meeting of the Society of Vertebrate Paleontology.

The specimen spent five years, from 1994 to 1999, in Munich on loan from the Aktien-Verein. Though technically still under private ownership, it began being referred to as "the Munich specimen" around this time and was coveted by a number of potential buyers for amounts well into the millions of marks range. The head of the Solenhofer Aktien-Verein, Dr. Michael Bücker, expressed interest in selling the specimen around the end of the loan period to Munich, and eventually the fossil was offered to the Bavarian State Collection for 2 million deutschmarks. In this way, the Bavarian State Collection was able to purchase an Archaeopteryx specimen for the first time in 160 years, and remains a uniquely important cultural and scientific object to the state of Bavaria.

=== Specimen ===
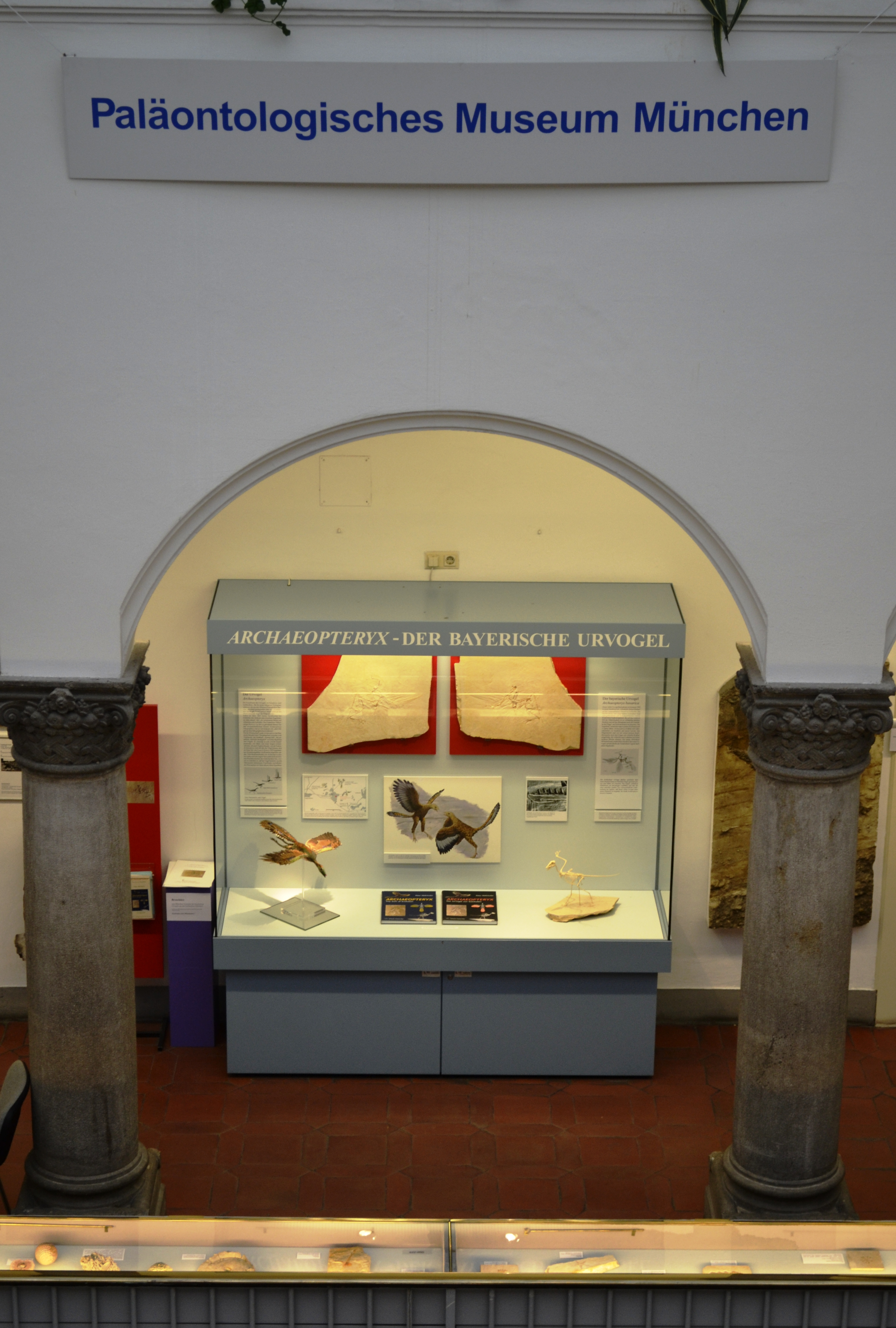
Munich specimen display case at the Munich Museum of Paleontology

The exact position of the specimen in the limestone layer is known, indicating that the Munich specimen is the highest in the Plattenkalk profile of Upper Solnhofen limestone and therefore the geologically youngest. Found in the same area were the Maxberg specimen at 8.5 m below the Munich specimen, and the London specimen at 14.5 m, indicating that these Archaeopteryx specimens were buried in the same location but something like 45,000 years (for the Maxberg specimen) and 75,000 years (for the London) earlier. (Barthel 1978, Viohl 1985a, Park & Fürsich 2001a, b)

==== Skeleton ====
Both main slab and counterslab were recovered, and while the main slab preserves the bones of the skeleton better, the feather imprints are clearer on the counterslab. The skeleton is nearly complete, and retains most of its natural articulation. The skull is one of the only features not completely preserved, with only the braincase, ear region, jugal, lower jaw, and a few other pieces roughly intact. A detailed analysis of the skull elements of this specimen has been published by Elzanowski & Wellnhofer (1996).

The teeth of the lower jaw are particularly well-preserved and the anterior third of this mandible is occupied by a total of twelve teeth, equally spaced, which are consistent in morphology but not in size. Some of the smaller teeth appear recently erupted at time of death, indicating a specific tooth replacement pattern. The Munich specimen provided the first evidence of interdental plates in Archaeopteryx, the presence of which is evidence of a primitive (plesiomorphic) condition: this feature is present in a variety of other archosaurs, but is notably absent in birds.

Much of the rest of the skeleton is excellently preserved, including the normal vertebral count in Archaeopteryx, cervical ribs, gastralia, naturally contacted (and not co-ossified) scapula and coracoid, pelvic girdle, and hind limbs. Both arms are preserved naturally articulated, but the humeri of both are only partially preserved. The specimen was first described as having a bony sternum, which would have been the first evidence for a breastbone in Archaeopteryx (Wellnhofer 1993a). However, when examined with sophisticated ultraviolet techniques, this was revealed to be a medial, plate-like extension of the left coracoid, which had been rotated after death (Wellnhofer & Tischlinger 2004). It was largely the assumption of this bony sternum that led to the fossil's original classification of a new taxon, Archaeopteryx bavarica.

The hind limbs, while showing no morphological differences from previously known specimens, were perhaps the best preserved yet and showed some unprecedented details. For example, the right foot was preserved so tightly flexed that the claws of the first and fourth toes are overlapping, indicating that a grasping or perching function was present in Archaeopteryx, possibly as sophisticated as that of modern birds.

==== Plumage ====
Only the imprints of wing and tail feathers are present, and all sign of feathers comes from the counterslab. No body feathers are evident. The right wing displays a fan-like arrangement of primary feathers which number at eleven to twelve, as is typical for Archaeopteryx specimens. Some of the specimen's arm feathers show indicators not just of shafts but also vanes and rami. The less-clear secondaries are also visible. Despite its much smaller body size, the Munich specimen's longest primary—the sixth—approaches that of the London specimen, and would also be considerably longer proportionally than that of the Berlin specimen.

The tail feathers are imprinted biserially along the caudal vertebrae, which is typical for the genus, and preservation begins around the 9th caudal. The longest tail feathers, at the distal tip, are also much relatively longer than the same feathers in the London specimen. The reason for the Munich specimen's comparatively longer wing and tail feathers is not known, but could be individual variation, age difference or sex difference.

== The Daiting specimen ==
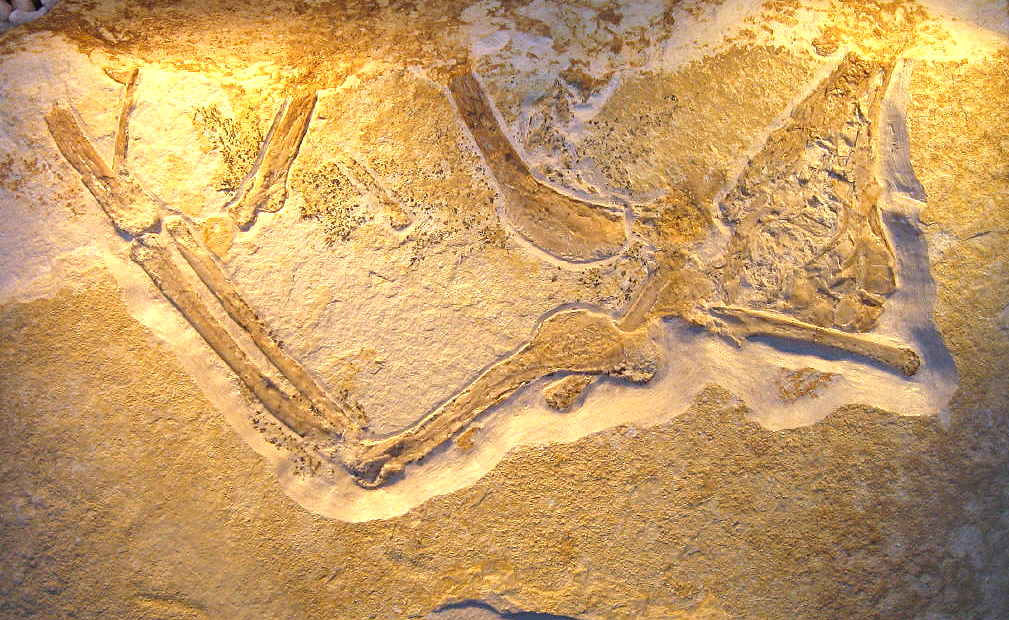
Daiting Specimen, holotype of Archaeopteryx albersdoerferi

An eighth, fragmentary specimen was discovered in 1990, not in Solnhofen limestone, but in somewhat younger sediments from the Mörnsheim Formation at Daiting, Suevia. It is therefore known as the Daiting Specimen, and had been known since 1996 only from a cast, briefly shown at the Naturkundemuseum in Bamberg. The original was purchased by palaeontologist Raimund Albertsdörfer in 2009. The specimen was also called "The Phantom" because it was long kept away from scientists. It was on display for the first time with six other original fossils of Archaeopteryx at the Munich Mineral Show in October 2009. A first, quick look by scientists indicates that this specimen might represent a new species of Archaeopteryx. It was found in a limestone bed that was a few hundred thousand years younger than the other finds. After a lengthy period in a closed, private collection, it was moved to the Museum of Evolution at Knuthenborg Safaripark (Denmark) in 2022, where it has since been on display and also been made available for researchers.

=== History ===
The eighth specimen of Archaeopteryx was officially announced in February 1996 at a special exhibition at Bavaria's Naturkunde Museum. Its director, Matthias Mäuser, made the announcement to a surprised audience that the specimen had already been cast and that this was on display in the exhibit. Few details were known of its origin or preparation, but it was concluded that the type of preservation indicated a Mörnsheim formation origin, which overlies the Solnhofen proper and is slightly younger. Since the best-known vertebrate Mörnsheim fossils come from the Daiting quarry, the eighth specimen is thought to have originated there. However, it remains possible that it came instead from a quarry near Mülheim. The Daiting Specimen was given the name Archaeopteryx albersdoerferi by Kundrat et al. (2018).

=== Specimen ===
Only one scientific analysis, conducted by Matthias Mäuser in 1997, has been performed on the cast of this specimen. The fossil displays only a skull and a few skeletal elements including scapulae, a humerus, a furcula, and a wing with incomplete hand. Based on the length of the humerus, Mäuser has estimated the size of the animal to approximate that of the Thermopolis specimen. Otherwise, without subjecting the original fossil to further mechanical preparation, X-ray or UV investigations, there is little more that can be known.

Though unremarkable in anatomy and preservation, the Daiting specimen is the first evidence of Archaeopteryx persisting past the span of geologic time indicated by the Solnhofen formation. Wellnhofer speculates that this specimen could have lived around a hundred thousand years later than the Solnhofen specimens, but concedes that possible osteological changes over this span of time could not be reliably ascertained without access to the original fossil.

== The Bürgermeister-Müller specimen ==
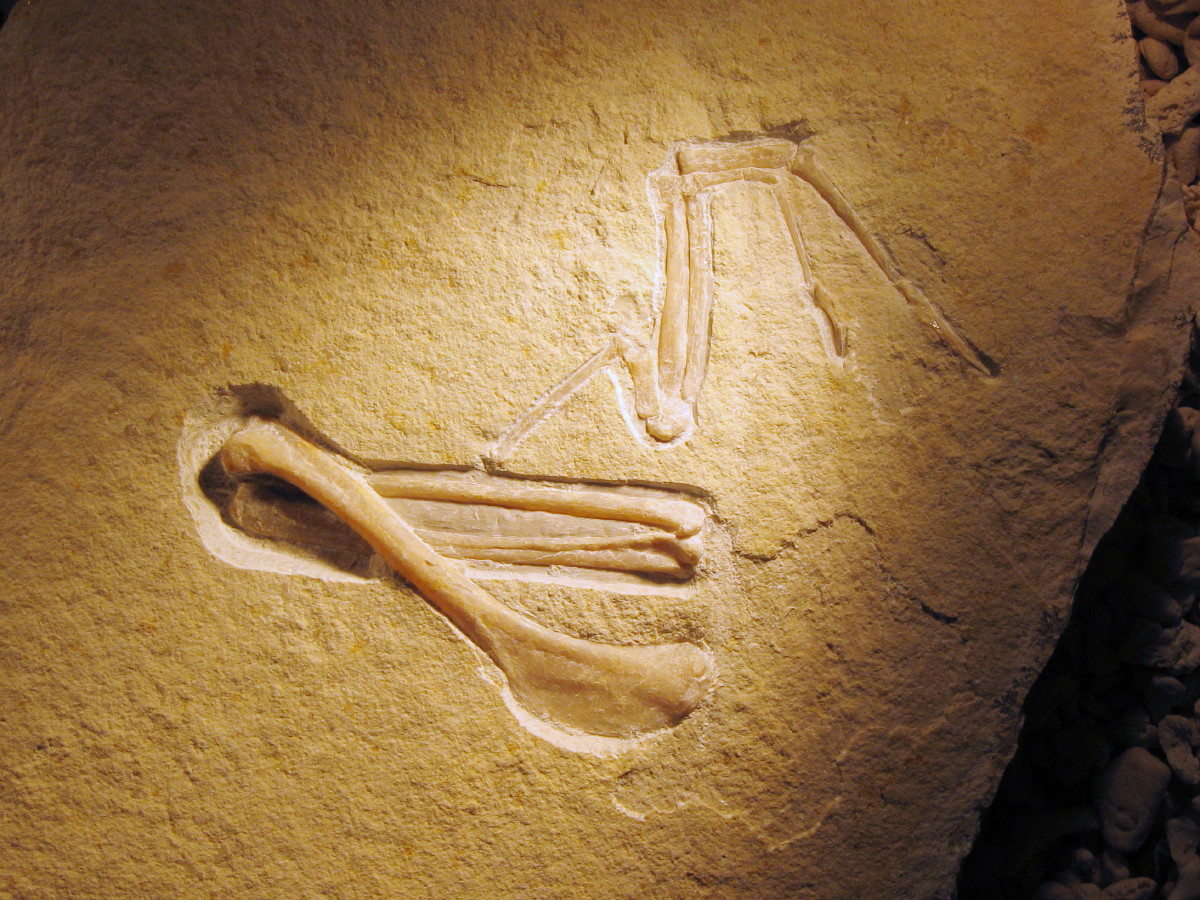
Bürgermeister-Müller ("chicken wing") Specimen

Another fragmentary fossil was found in 2000. It is in private possession and since 2004 on loan to the Bürgermeister-Müller Museum in Solnhofen, so it is called the Bürgermeister-Müller Specimen; the institute itself officially refers to it as the "Exemplar of the families Ottman & Steil, Solnhofen". As the fragment represents the remains of a single wing of Archaeopteryx, the popular name of this fossil is "chicken wing".

=== History ===
This ninth specimen of Archaeopteryx first came to light in spring of 2004 when it was presented to the Bürgermeister-Müller Museum by quarry worker Karl Schwegler. He claimed to have discovered it in a quarry above Solnhofen, on the Old Steinberg. After the specimen was recognized for what it was—the wing bones of an Archaeopteryx—an agreement was arranged for the fossil to go on an unlimited loan to the Solnhofen Museum, and the owners subsequently agreed to let it undergo scientific investigation by the Bavarian State Collection in Munich. The fossil was unveiled to the public in summer of 2004 and has been on display in the Bürgermeister-Müller Museum ever since.

=== Specimen ===
The fossil, which had been immediately nicknamed the "chicken wing" upon unveiling, consists of an isolated wing skeleton which includes the upper and lower arm, which are crossed following post-mortem displacement, as well as an almost-complete hand. Most of the bones are preserved three-dimensionally on the main slab. The humerus shows an "unfinished" exterior typical of death prior to final stage of ossification, indicating another immature specimen.

On the counterslab, traces of distinct and slightly curved elevations can be seen in a fan-like arrangement around the second finger. These are assumed to be imprints of the shafts of primary remiges.

== The Thermopolis specimen ==
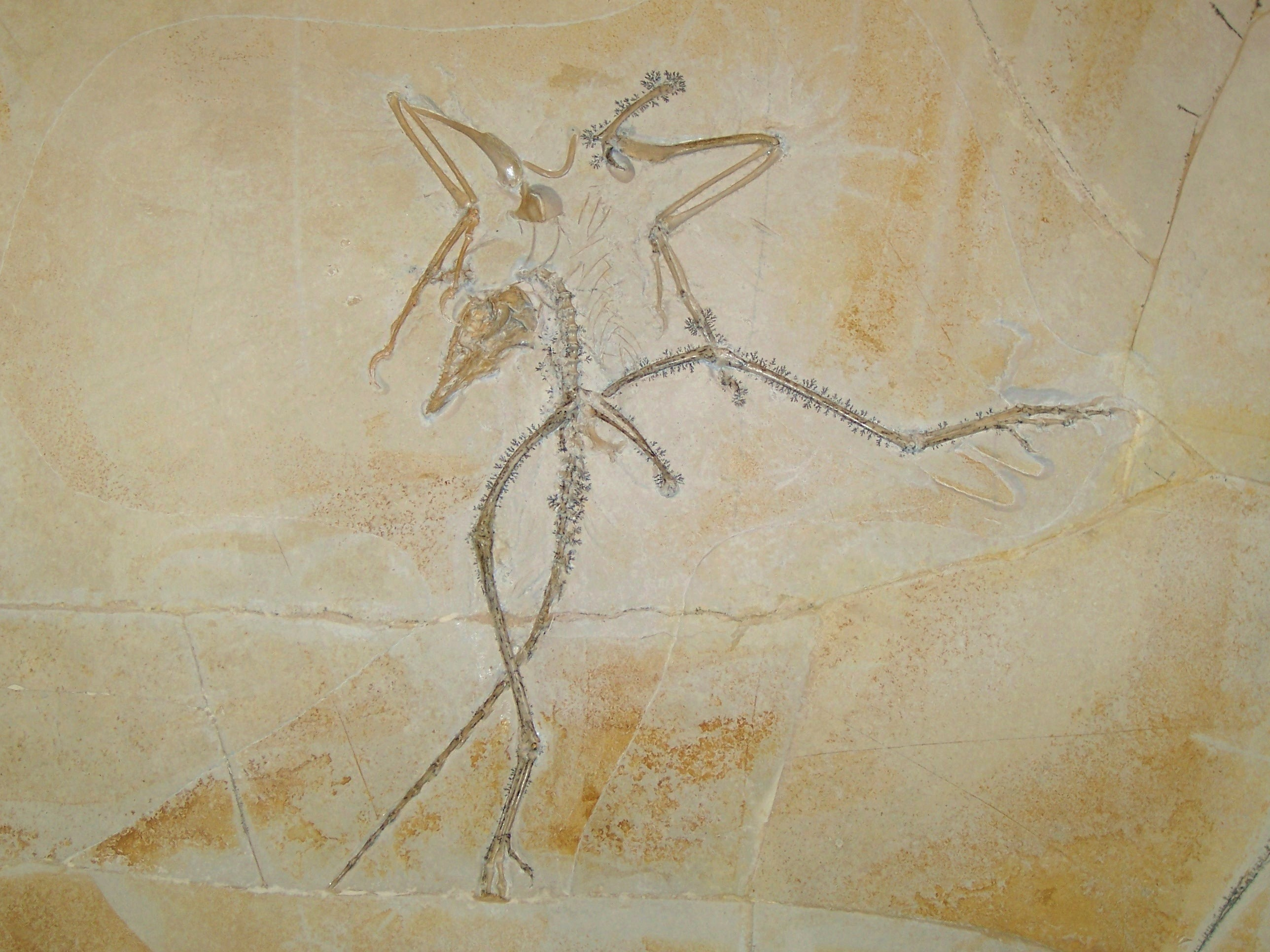
The Thermopolis specimen

Long in a private collection in Switzerland, the Thermopolis Specimen (WDC CSG 100) was discovered in Bavaria and described in 2005 by Mayr, Pohl, and Peters. Donated to the Wyoming Dinosaur Center in Thermopolis, Wyoming, it has the best-preserved head and feet; most of the neck and the lower jaw have not been preserved. The "Thermopolis" specimen was described in 2 December 2005 Science journal article as "A well-preserved Archaeopteryx specimen with theropod features"; it shows that the Archaeopteryx lacked a reversed toe – a universal feature of birds – limiting its ability to perch on branches and implying a terrestrial or trunk-climbing lifestyle. This has been interpreted as evidence of theropod ancestry. In 1988, Gregory S. Paul claimed to have found evidence of a hyperextensible second toe, but this was not verified and accepted by other scientists until the Thermopolis specimen was described. "Until now, the feature was thought to belong only to the species' close relatives, the deinonychosaurs."

The Thermopolis Specimen was assigned to Archaeopteryx siemensii in 2007. The specimen is considered the most complete and well preserved Archaeopteryx remains yet.

=== History ===
This specimen first came to light around the end of 2001, when it was offered to the Senckenberg Museum in Frankfurt by an anonymous collector. No details were provided about the specific place or time of discovery. More information came to light in 2005 via a statement issued by the Wyoming Dinosaur Center (WDC), which asserted that the fossil came originally from the private collections of a Swiss fossil collector who had died in the 1970s, and whose wife then offered the fossil for sale to the Senckenberg Museum shortly thereafter. Unable to raise the requisite funds, the museum approached the Wyoming Dinosaur Center's founder Burkhard Pohl, who was able to find an anonymous donor willing to offer up the funds. After an initial period of display and scientific study in Germany, the specimen would then be given to the WDC on a long-term loan.

After a period of research (Mayr et al. 2005, 2007), the fossil was transferred to the Wyoming Dinosaur Center of Thermopolis, Wyoming, where it has remained since June 2007. The export out of Germany of this specimen—widely considered to be one of the best Archaeopteryx fossils known—has caused some concern among German paleontologists and the public. Though no formal legality was broken by the export of the fossil to Switzerland in the 1970s, nor to the U.S. where it remains, there was some initial concern over the potential availability of the fossil for scientific scrutiny, given that the WDC is a private, not public, institution. (Stoksad 2005) However, the WDC has issued a statement that they will pose no barrier to scientific inquiry from home or abroad, and intend to leave the fossil on public display indefinitely. Thus the Thermopolis specimen of Archaeopteryx is the first to find a permanent home outside of Europe, in the U.S.

=== Specimen ===
In sheer completeness, articulation and detail, the Thermopolis specimen is surely one of the best, and is said to be surpassed in beauty only by the Berlin specimen. The skeleton has been professionally prepared, and some of the bones, including the skull, are preserved in three dimensions. The only missing parts include some presacral and final caudal vertebrae, as well as some small pieces of the right foot. The specimen also preserves voluminous plumage whose imprints show feathers still attached to the wings and tail, indicating a relatively short period of floating on the surface waters of the bird's ancient lagoons before preservation.

==== Skeleton ====
The skull of the Thermopolis specimen rivals only the Berlin and Eichstätt as the best-preserved of any Archaeopteryx specimen. It is the only one that shows the skull in dorsal view, permitting access to details hitherto unknown. Most of the mandible is overlapped and hidden by the skull, though the tips of five dentary teeth are visible through the right nasal opening.

Ten of the standard 23 presacral vertebrae are missing, as well as the last several caudals of the tail-tip. Chevrons along the tail—large, plate-like hemophophyses—are visible and well-developed in this specimen. Only a few ribs are preserved, lacking the ones associated with the missing thoracic vertebrae, and ventrally preserved gastralia are preserved showing an asymmetrical zigzag pattern similar to that in confuciusornithines (Chiappe et al. 1999).

The specimen shows, for the first time in an Archaeopteryx specimen, an entirely exposed coracoid, which shows some unprecedented details. As in all other specimens, there is no ossified sternum. This and other details of the humerus suggest, like the other specimens, an animal immature at the time of death.

The hind limbs are particularly well-preserved and show a handful of unprecedented details. Unlike other specimens, the hind legs are splayed apart in opposite directions, and most of their elements have remained in natural articulation. The excellent detail of the feet shows that the first toe (hallux) was not fully reversed, as in most modern birds, and instead is spread medially on both feet. Some researchers have subsequently considered the appearance of a reversed hallux in other specimens to be an artifact of preservation. (Mayr et al. 2005)

Another unique feature of the feet that has come to light via the Thermopolis specimen is the orientation of the second toe, which shows features consistent with hyperextension, as in dromaeosaurs and troodontids. This specimen suggests that Archaeopteryx could have raised its short second toe in a similar manner to its dromaeosaur cousin Deinonychus, whose second toe bore an enlarged "sickle claw" for probable use in predation. It remains unclear whether Archaeopteryx also used its hyperextended toe-claw in a similar fashion or for some other purpose.

Taken together, many of the unique features of the skull, feet and coracoid strengthen a close relationship of archaeopterygids to deinonychosaurian theropods.

==== Plumage ====
Well-preserved imprints of wing and tail plumage show details of the barbs, but not barbules, and the shafts of 11 primaries can be counted on the right wing. Asymmetry is visible on the eighth to tenth primaries. The secondaries are too faint to be counted, but are assumed to range between 12 and 15. "Marked, fuzzy furrows" around the elbow joint may have indicated tertiaries.

The tail feathers (rectrices) are also too faint to be confidently counted, but barbs are nevertheless observable though fainter than those on the wings. All of the tail feathers appear to attach to the vertebral column at the same angle of around 30 degrees.

== The eleventh specimen ==
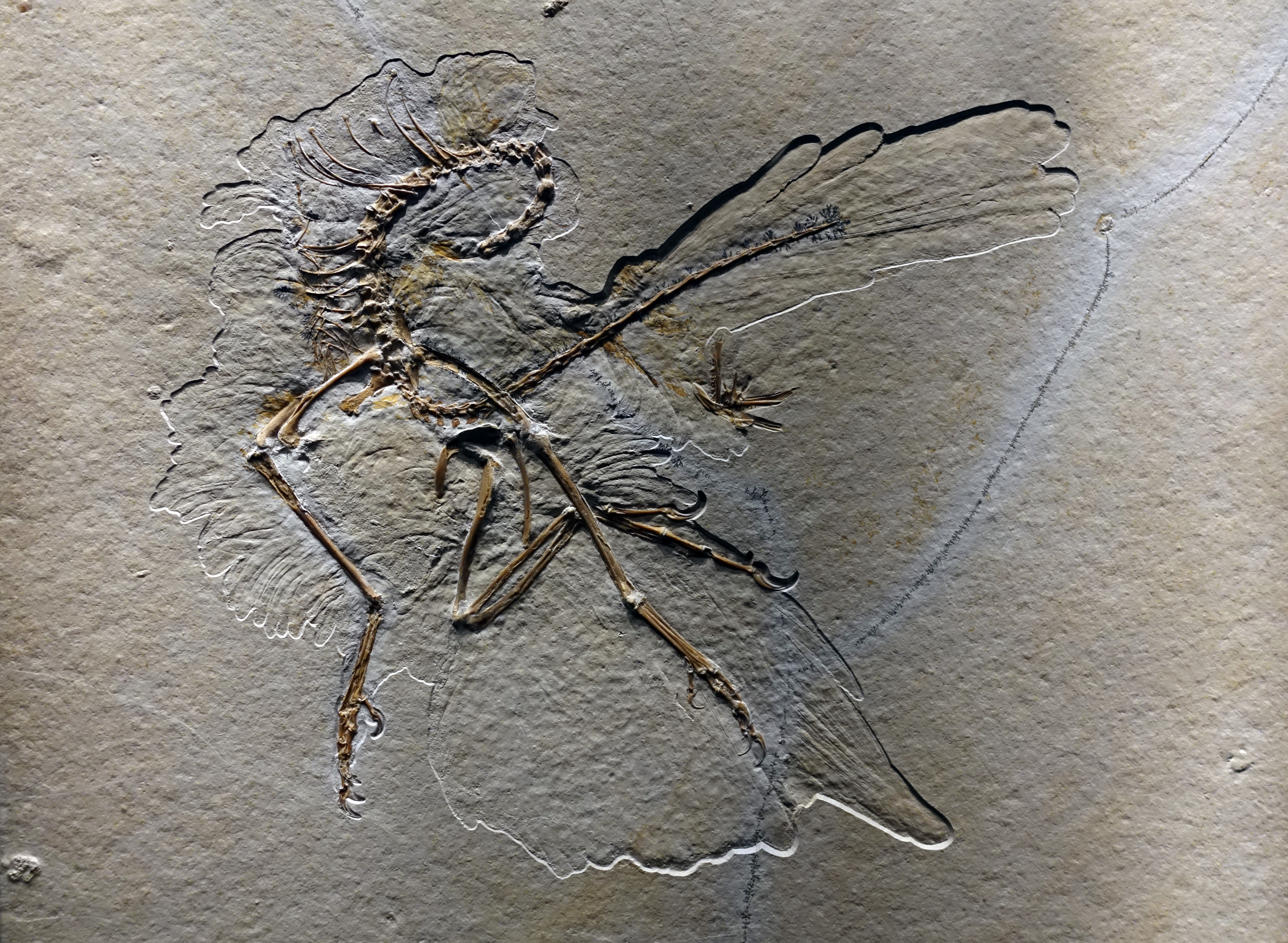
The eleventh specimen

In 2011, the discovery of an eleventh specimen was announced. It is said to be one of the more complete specimens, but is missing the skull and one forelimb. It is privately owned and has yet to be given a name. Paleontologists of LMU Munich are currently studying it. This specimen reveals previously unknown features of the plumage. Foth et al. (2014) describe pennaceous feathers not only on the wings and tail, but on the body and legs, features previously unseen in Archaeopteryx. The eleventh specimen provides insight into the original function of pennaceous feathers. An analysis of the phylogenetic distribution of pennaceous feathers on advanced maniraptoran theropod dinosaurs and basal birds suggests an original function other than flight. Pennaceous feathers thus represent an exaptation and were only later adapted for aerodynamic capabilities, a function that was apparently convergent among different groups within Avialae. It is on loan to the Naturmuseum Senckenberg in Frankfurt.

== The twelfth specimen ==
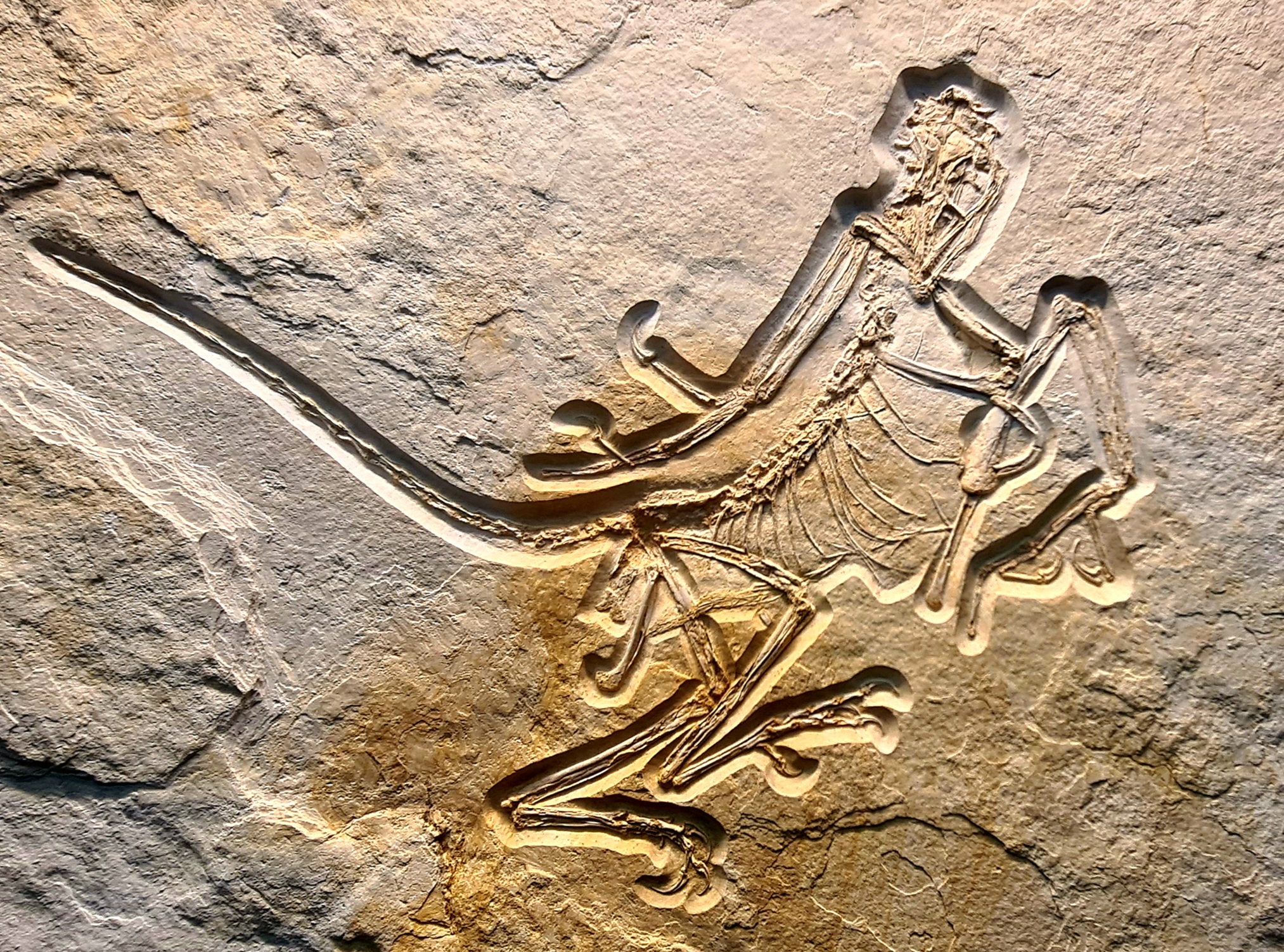
The twelfth specimen

In February 2014, the existence of a twelfth specimen was announced from an Altmannstein quarry near the Schamhaupten district of Bavaria. This specimen was unearthed by a private collector in 2010. Based on a new diagnosis for the genus Archaeopteryx, by the German paleontologist Oliver Rauhut, the Berlin, Eichstätt, Solnhofen, Munich, Daiting, Thermopolis, 11th, and 12th specimens can be referred to this genus with high certainty. It is on display at the Dinosaurier Museum Altmühltal in Denkendorf.

== The thirteenth specimen —SMNK-PAL 10,000 ==
The thirteenth specimen

A thirteenth specimen, SMNK-PAL 10,000, was published in January 2025, this one from the Mörnsheim Formation. It preserves the right forelimb, shoulder, and fragments of the other limbs, with various features of the shoulder and forelimb resembling Archaeopteryx more than any other avialan within the Mörnsheim Formation. However, due to the fragmentary nature of this specimen, it cannot be assigned to a specific species within Archaeopteryx.

== The Chicago specimen ==
The Chicago specimen

In May 2024, the Field Museum in Chicago, US unveiled the fourteenth known specimen of Archaeopteryx, and the only specimen of Archaeopteryx in a public institution outside Europe (the other American specimen, the Thermopolis specimen, is owned by a private institution). The specimen's existence was first known around 2018 by museum curator Helge Thorsten Lumbsch, who found the specimen in a private collection in Switzerland; it had been acquired by these private collectors prior to Germany's ban on exporting Archaeopteryx specimens. Following several years of negotiations with the efforts of museum paleornithologist Jingmai O'Connor, the specimen was acquired in 2022. In contrast to other Archaeopteryx specimens, the Chicago specimen was unprepared at its acquisition, requiring two years of preparation with the efforts of museum preparators Akiko Shinya & Connie Van Beek before its official unveiling. In 2025, the paleornithologist Jingmai O'Connor and colleagues officially published a study describing this fourteenth specimen, reporting the first known tertials (specialized inner secondary flight feathers) and other novel features in Archaeopteryx.

== Sources ==
- Wellnhofer, Peter (2009). Archaeopteryx: The Icon of Evolution. Munich: Verlag Dr. Friedrich Pfeil. ISBN 978-3-89937-108-6.
- Shipman, Pat (1998). Taking Wing: Archaeopteryx and the Evolution of Bird Flight. London: Weidenfeld & Nicolson. ISBN 978-0-297-84156-2.
