= Andrzej Elżanowski =

Polish palaeontologist and zoologist (1950–2026)

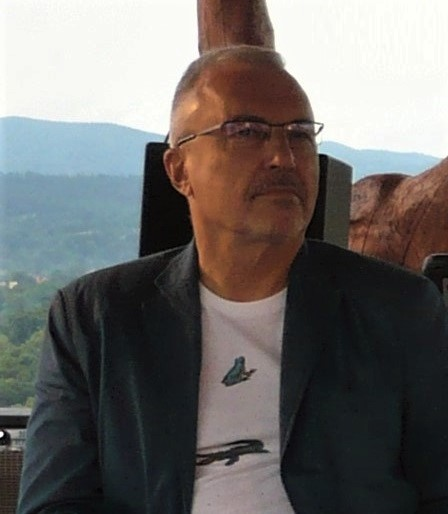
- Elżanowski in 2020
- Born: 21 January 1950; Przasnysz, Poland
- Died: 9 September 2026 (aged 76)
- Education: University of Warsaw
- Occupations: Palaeontologist, zoologist
- Employer: University of Warsaw

Andrzej Elżanowski (21 January 1950 – 9 September 2026) was a Polish palaeontologist and vertebrate zoologist specializing in bird phylogeny. Together with Peter Wellnhofer he described a coelurosaur theropod Archaeornithoides in 1992. He worked also on Mesozoic birds, especially Archaeopterygiformes – he is author of the chapter "Archaeopterygidae" in book edited by Luis Chiappe and Lawrence Witmer entitled Mesozoic Birds: Above the Heads of Dinosaurs. In 2001 he determined that Solnhofen specimen of Archaeopteryx represents new species and genus and coined new specific name – Wellnhoferia grandis – for it. He worked in the Faculty of "Artes Liberales” at the University of Warsaw.

Elżanowski died on 9 September 2026, at the age of 76.
