= Eduard Opitsch =

German quarry owner

Eduard Opitsch (1 February 1900 – 20 February 1991) was a German quarry owner whose name is associated to a specimen of the prehistoric bird Archaeopteryx, the Maxberg specimen.

The so-called Maxberg specimen of Archaeopteryx lithographica has been discovered in 1956 in his quarry in Langenaltheim. Opitsch gave the fossil to the Maxberg Museum at Solnhofen. In 1974 he reintegrated the fossil into his private collection. When Opitsch died in 1991, it was found that the Archaeopteryx specimen was missing from his collection. The whereabouts of the fossil are unknown, but several photographs and a cast of it exist. Locals from Solnhofen believe that Opitsch buried it to keep it from his heirs.
