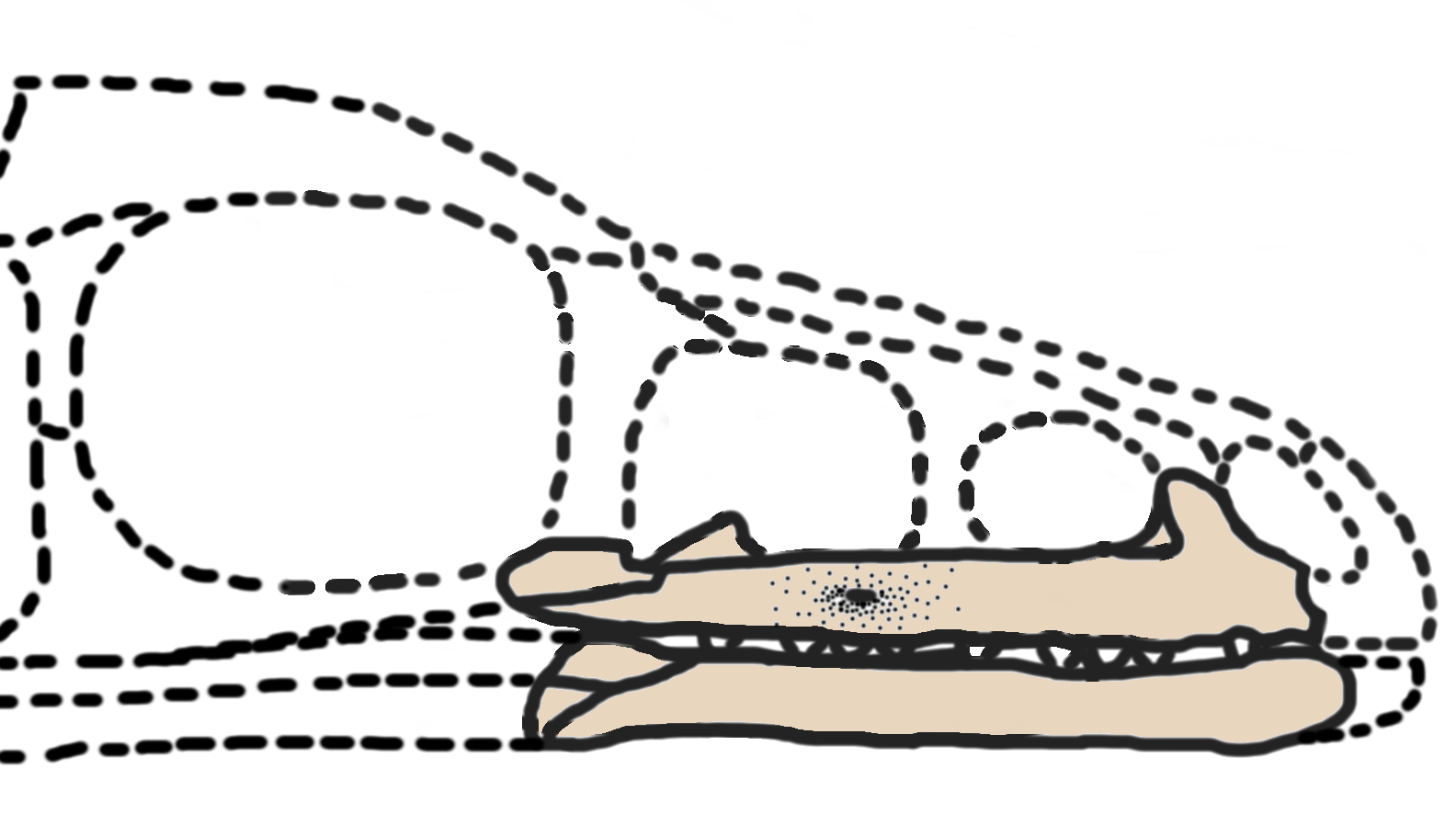
- Skull reconstruction, known material in brown

Scientific classification
- Kingdom: Animalia
- Phylum: Chordata
- Class: Reptilia
- Clade: Dinosauria
- Clade: Saurischia
- Clade: Theropoda
- Family: †Troodontidae
- Genus: †Archaeornithoides; Elzanowksi & Wellnhofer, 1992

Type species
- †Archaeornithoides deinosauriscus Elzanowski & Wellnhofer, 1992

= Archaeornithoides =

Archaeornithoides Temporal range: Late Cretaceous, 75 Ma

Extinct genus of dinosaurs

Archaeornithoides is a genus of maniraptoran theropod dinosaur of the Late Cretaceous of Mongolia.

== Discovery and naming ==
In 1965, a Polish-Mongolian paleontological expedition found a fossil of a small dinosaur at Bayn Dzak, Mongolia. In 1983, the find was reported by Andrzej Elzanowski. The remains were named as the type species Archaeornithoides deinosauriscus by Elzanowski and Peter Wellnhofer in 1992. In 1993, they were described in more detail by the same authors.

The generic name (Archaeornithoides) means “shaped like an ancient bird” in Ancient Greek, from ἀρχαῖος, archaios, "ancient"; ὄρνις, ornis, "bird"; and εἶδος, eidos, "form". The specific descriptor deinosauriscus, "little dinosaur", alludes to the animal's small size for a dinosaur.

The holotype, ZPAL MgD-II/29, was discovered in Late Cretaceous river sandstones of the Djadokhta Formation beds, dating from the late Campanian. It consists of an articulated but fragmentary skull and lower jaws comprehending paired maxillae, a partial jugal, palate bones and dentaries. The specimen represents a juvenile individual.

== Description ==
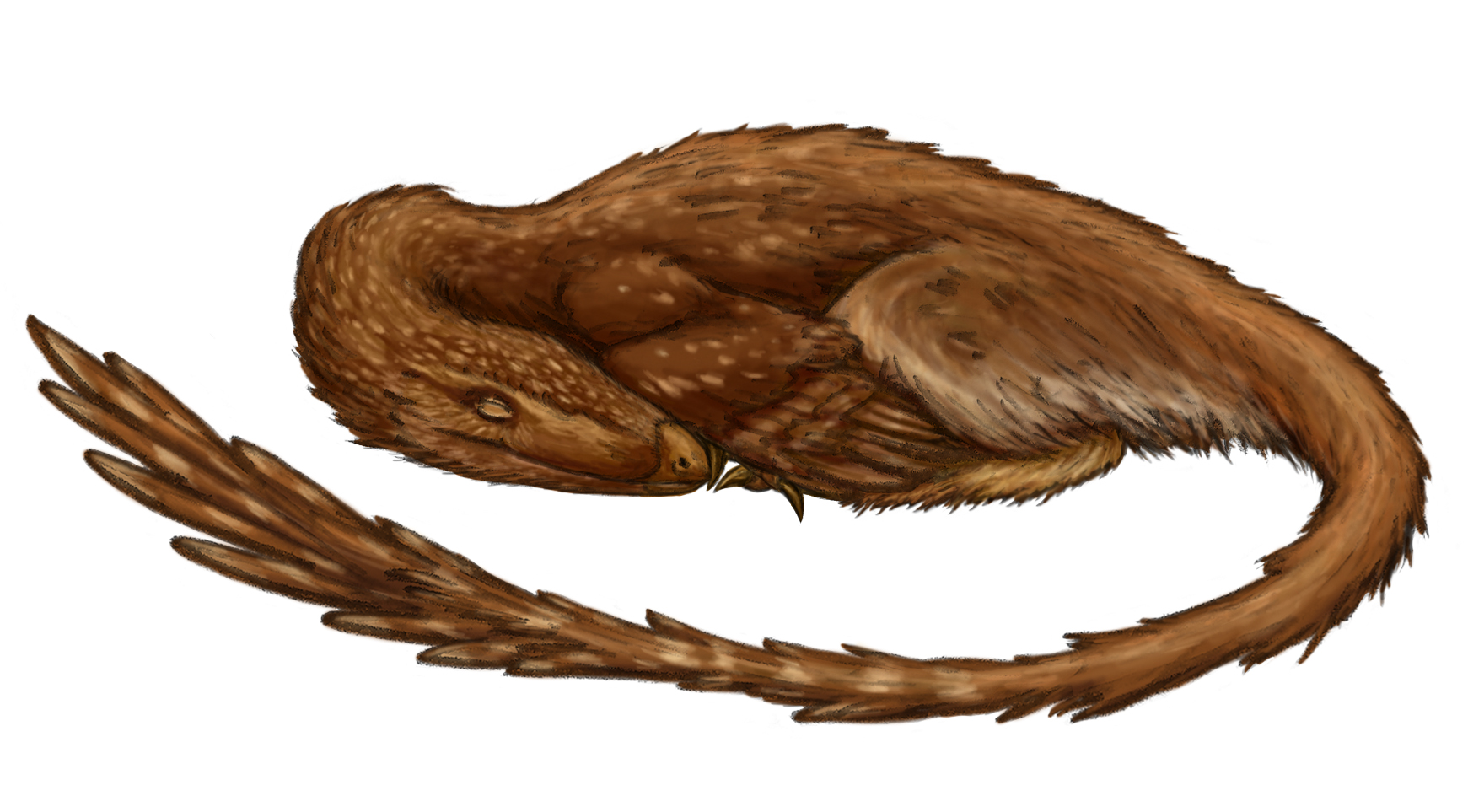
Life restoration showing Archaeornithoides in troodontid sleeping pose

The holotype of Archaeornithoides was a very small individual. The head fragment as preserved measures just twenty-seven millimetres in length, indicating an original skull length of about five centimetres. The body length was estimated at fifty to sixty centimetres, making the Archaeornithoides type one of the smallest known non-avian dinosaurs. Adult length is uncertain.

The snout of Archaeornithoides features a long antorbital fenestra, stretching over three quarters of the length of the maxilla. The maxilla bears at least eight teeth. These are small, conical and smooth, lacking wrinkles, serrations or carinae. The palatine bone seems to show the presence of a secondary fenestra.

== Classification ==
Elżanowski & Wellnhofer (1993) claimed that Archaeornithoides was the closest known relative to birds or Avialae. This conclusion rested on key bird-like features; an interdigitated suture between the premaxilla and maxilla, broad palatal shelves, pneumatic sinuses, lack of interdental plates, and unserrated teeth. Since publication, though, all of these features have been discovered in new fossils of adult and/or juvenile troodonts and dromaeosaurs. The describing authors in 1993 also concluded that Archaeornithoides was closely related to troodontids, Spinosauridae and Lisboasaurus, all these taxa together with birds forming a clade, showing that birds originated from a more basal position than normally assumed. However, subsequent research has not supported a close relationship between spinosaurids and troodontids and Lisboasaurus was later shown to be a lizard or a crocodylomorph.

Some scientists had suggested that the juvenile specimen of Archaeornithoides may belong to a previously known species of Mongolian troodontid, either Saurornithoides or Byronosaurus. However, studies of a juvenile Byronosaurus skull showed that theropod dinosaurs possess many distinctive adult characteristics even as hatchlings or embryos, and that the lack of characters solidly linking Archaeornithoides to known adult specimens shows that it is probably a distinct species. Bever and Norell (in 2009) found no evidence to support the placement of Archaeornithoides close to Avialae, and only weak support for the idea that it is a juvenile troodontid.

== Paleobiology ==
=== Paleopathology ===
Elzanowski and Wellnhofer noted that the specimen has distinct bite marks while the back of the head fragment was ragged, and suggested that the jaws were bitten off from its braincase by a Deltatheridium mammal the size of a weasel (adding that these are common in the Bayn Dzak assemblage). Clark and colleagues (2002) noted that it may have also passed through the digestive tract of the predator before fossilization. If true, this may be the first known evidence of Mesozoic mammals feeding on dinosaurs (see Repenomamus).
