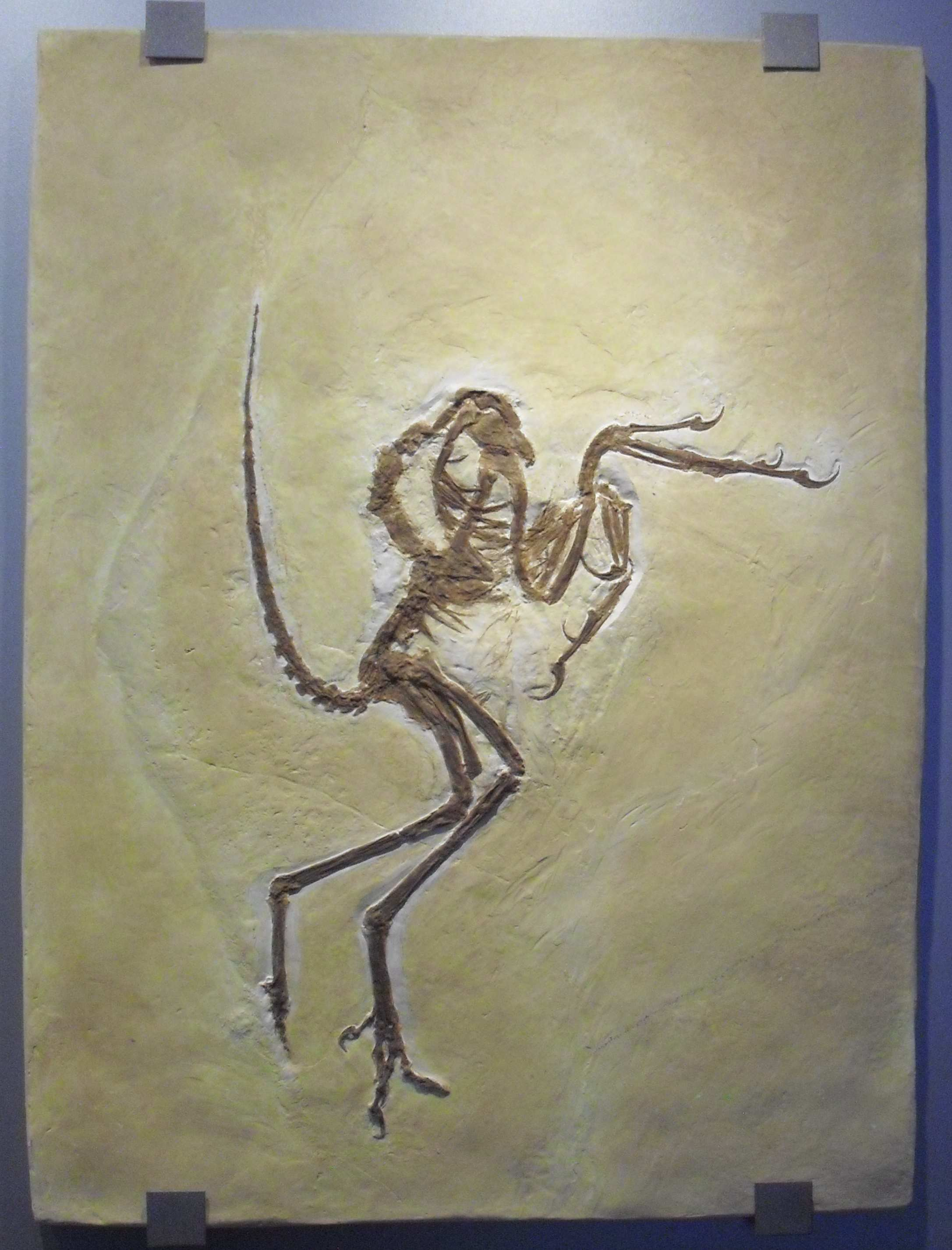
- The type specimen

Scientific classification
- Kingdom: Animalia
- Phylum: Chordata
- Class: Reptilia
- Clade: Dinosauria
- Clade: Saurischia
- Clade: Theropoda
- Family: †Archaeopterygidae
- Genus: †Wellnhoferia; Elżanowski, 2001

Type species
- †Wellnhoferia grandis Elżanowski, 2001

= Wellnhoferia =

Wellnhoferia Temporal range: Late Jurassic, 150 Ma

Extinct genus of dinosaurs

Wellnhoferia (named after Peter Wellnhofer) is a genus of early prehistoric bird-like theropod dinosaur closely related to Archaeopteryx. It is known from a single species, W. grandis, that lived in what is now Germany, during the Late Jurassic. While Wellnhoferia was similar to Archaeopteryx, it had a shorter tail and its fourth toe was shorter than that of Archaeopteryx. Andrzej Elżanowski (2001) of the Institute of Zoology of the University of Wrocław, Poland, determined the differences resulted from a "phylogenetic reduction rather than individual variation."

== Taxonomy ==
Wellnhoferia (orange) and seven specimens of Archaeopteryx compared to a human in scale

The type specimen is the Solnhofen Specimen of Archaeopteryx (BSP 1999). Discovered in the 1960s near Eichstätt, Germany and described in 1988 by Wellnhofer (as a specimen of Archaeopteryx), it is now in the Bürgermeister-Müller-Museum in Solnhofen. It was originally classified as a Compsognathus by an amateur collector.

Although Elżanowski found significant differences between Wellnhoferia and Archaeopteryx, a 2007 study by Mayr et al. found Wellnhoferia was a specimen of Archaeopteryx lithographica. Senter and Robins (2003), however, supported Elżanowski's naming of a new genus.
