= Interdental plate =

Anatomical structure

The interdental plate refers to the bone-filled mesial-distal region between the teeth. The word "interdental" is a combination of "inter" + "dental" (meaning "between the teeth") which originated in approximately 1870. In paleobiology, the presence or absence of the interdental plate can determine the place of an animal in the evolutionary scale, and paleontologists use the interdental plate when trying to classify a new specimen. Thecodont reptiles and theropod dinosaur fossils have an interdental plate, whereas acrodont reptiles such as Sphenodontia do not. Its presence in Archaeopteryx, an extinct avialan, resulted in the proposal of the dinosaur-bird connection.

The term can also be used to refer to a manufactured object designed to be placed or worn between the teeth. An example would be a dental prosthetic designed to prevent contact between the teeth while the wearer is sleeping. A 2004 patent relates to an apparatus designed to measure the pressure exerted by the tongue as a means of diagnosing ailments related to swallowing.

== See also ==
- Interdental consonant
- Interdental lisp
- Interdental woodstick
- Unvoiced interdental fricative
- Voiced interdental fricative
- Voiceless interdental fricative
