= Bürgermeister-Müller-Museum =

Museum in Solnhofen, Bavaria, Germany

Coordinates: 48°53′31″N 10°59′32″E

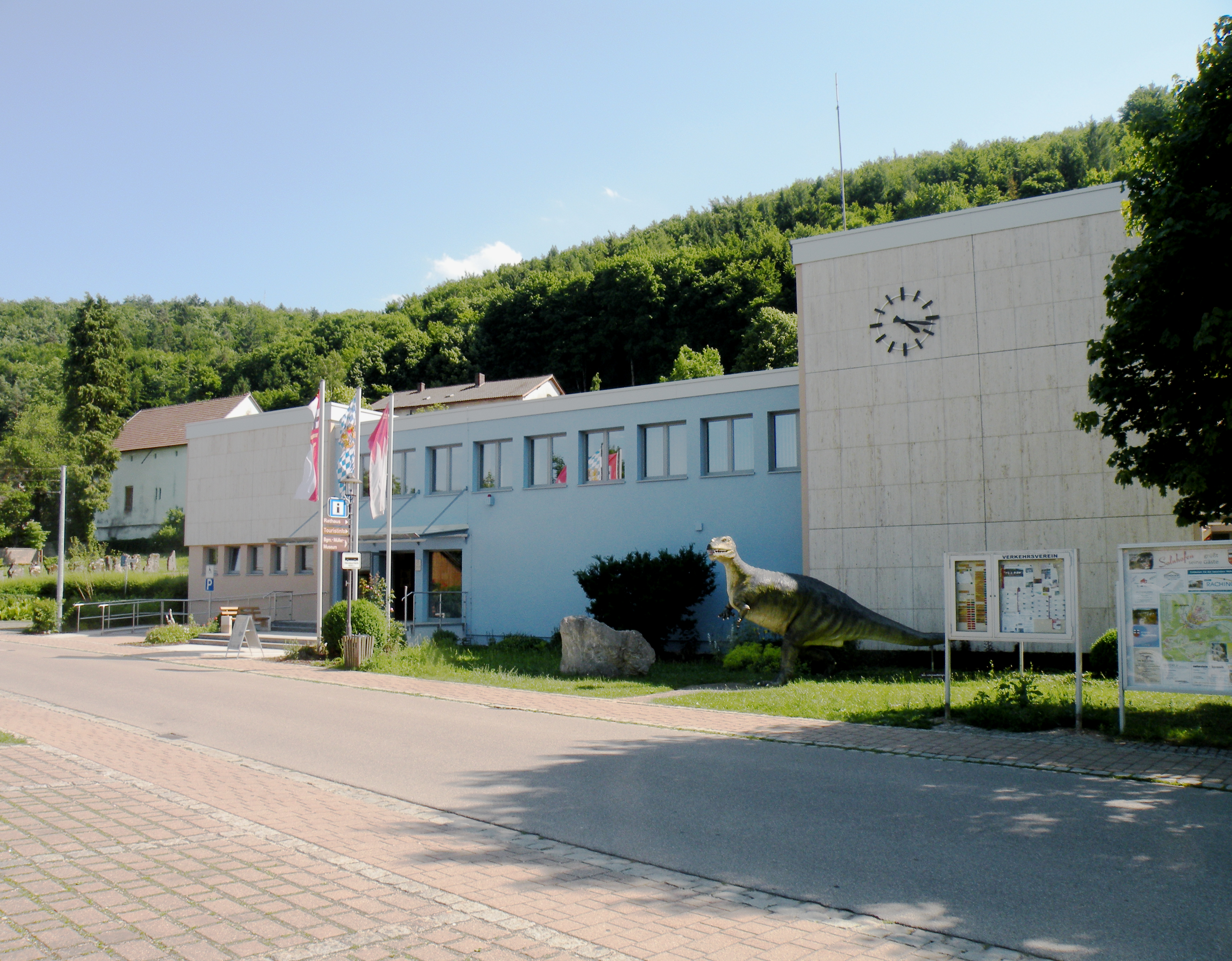
The Bürgermeister-Müller-Museum

Bürgermeister-Müller-Museum, Solnhofen

The Bürgermeister-Müller-Museum is a natural history museum in Solnhofen, Germany. In 1954 the mayor, Friedrich Mueller, made his private collection accessible to the public. In 1968 the museum was officially founded by the Solnhofen municipality. It was opened in 1970. The museum collection, which extends over two floors, mainly consists of fossils from the Solnhofen Plattenkalk and includes pterosaurs, one of the eleven known specimens of the Jurassic bird Archaeopteryx and an extensive collection of fossil fish. Also, there is a department dedicated to lithography.
