= Workerszell =

Coordinates: 48.927146°N 11.150673°E

Workerszell is a village in the municipality of Schernfeld north of Eichstätt in Bavaria, Germany, stretching alongside the B 13 road, situated in the Franconian Jura.

Up until its incorporation to Schernfeld in 1978, Workerszell forms with the districts Rupertsbuch, Geländer, Petershöhe (dissolved), Lohrmannshof, Sperberslohe and Langensallach an independent municipality.

Workerszell's economy was traditionally based on farming and quarrying.
