= Maxberg Museum =

Former museum in Germany

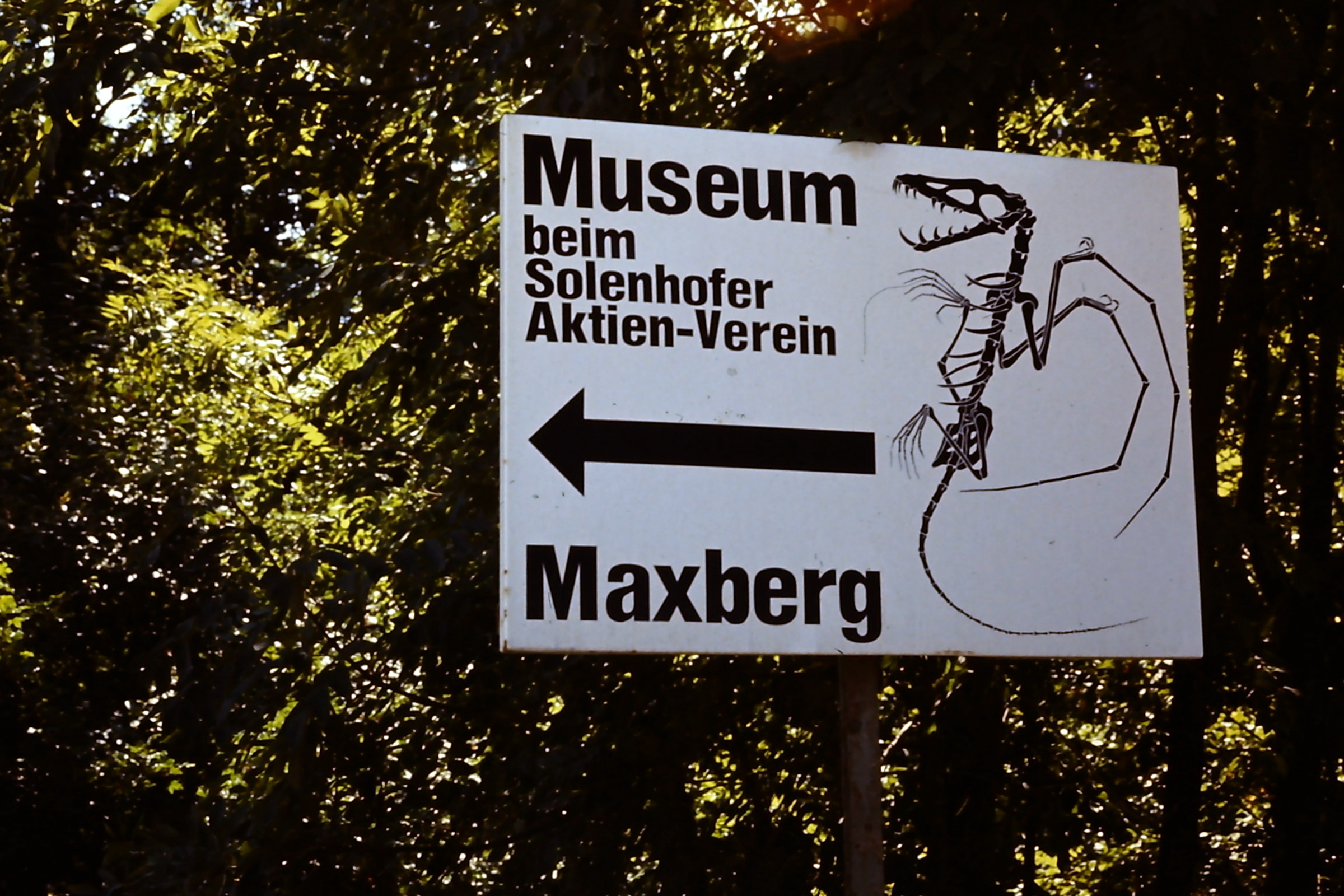
Road sign to the museum (photo taken in 1990).

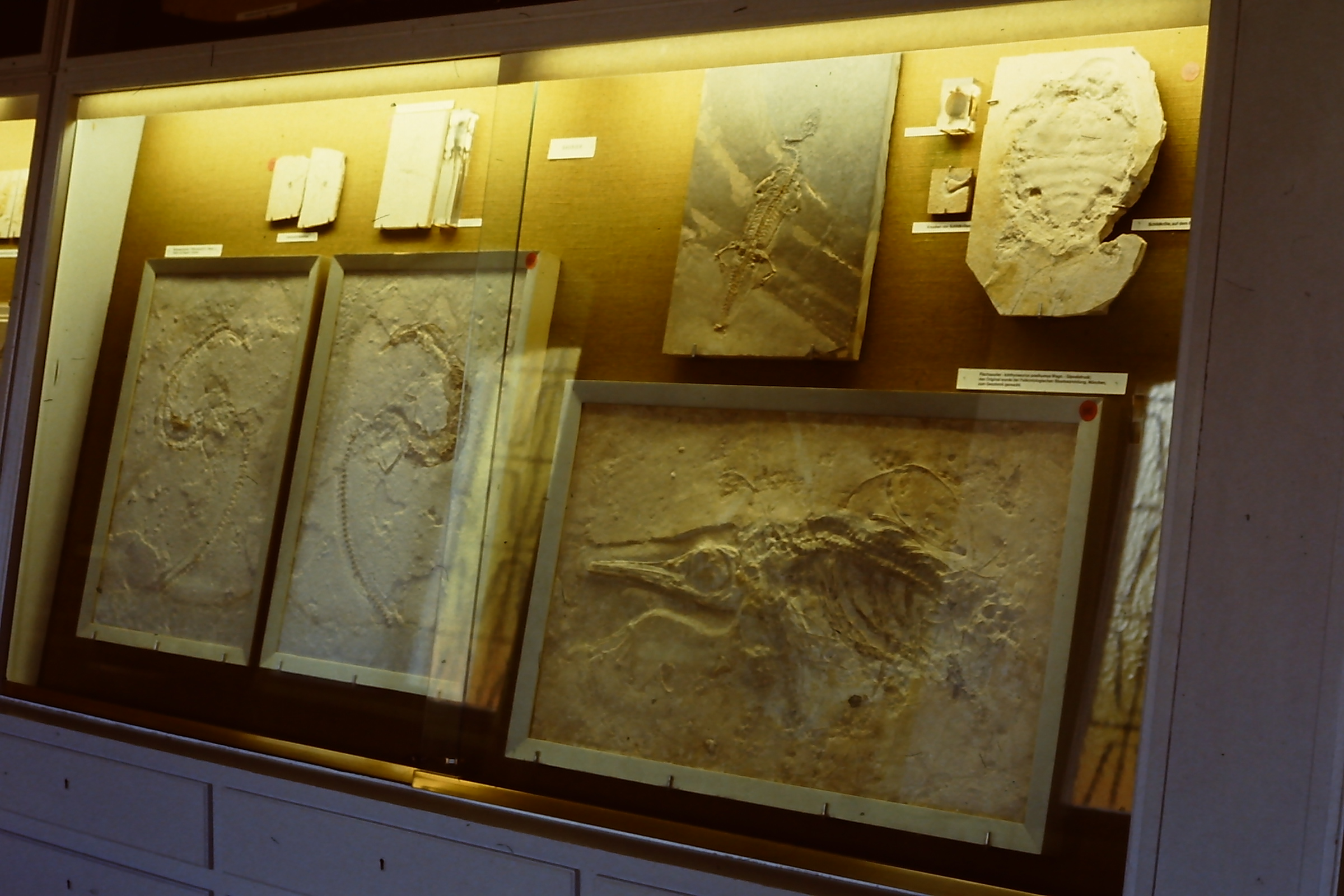
Showcase with fossils of reptiles in the Maxberg Museum old place.

The Maxberg Museum (a.k.a. Museum beim Solenhofer Aktien-Verein) was a German museum situated in Mörnsheim in the natural park of Altmühltal, near Solnhofen. It was founded by Alphons L. Zehntner in 1929. In 2004 was moved near to the town of Gunzenhausen, with the new name of Fossilien und Steindruck Museum (Fossils and Lithography Museum).

It has a large collection of fossils from the Solnhofen lithographic limestones, that once included a specimen of the early bird Archaeopteryx, the now missing Maxberg specimen.
