= Langenaltheim =

- Municipality
- Coat of arms

- Location of Langenaltheim within Weißenburg-Gunzenhausen district
- Interactive map of Langenaltheim
- Location within Germany Location within Bavaria
- Coordinates: 48°54′N 10°56′E
- Country: Germany
- State: Bavaria
- Admin. region: Mittelfranken
- District: Weißenburg-Gunzenhausen

Government
  - Mayor (2020–26): Alfred Maderer (FW)

Area
  - Total: 39.05 km^{2} (15.08 sq mi)
- Elevation: 555 m (1,821 ft)

Population (2025-12-31)
  - Total: 2,221
  - Density: 56.88/km^{2} (147.3/sq mi)
- Time zone: UTC+01:00 (CET)
  - Summer (DST): UTC+02:00 (CEST)
- Postal codes: 91799
- Dialling codes: 09145
- Vehicle registration: WUG
- Website: www.langenaltheim.de

Langenaltheim is a municipality in the Middle Franconian district of Weißenburg-Gunzenhausen in Germany.
