= Peter Wellnhofer =

German paleontologist

Peter Wellnhofer (born Munich, 1936) is a German paleontologist at the Bayerische Staatssammlung fur Paläontologie in Munich. He is best known for his work on the various fossil specimens of Archaeopteryx or "Urvogel", the first known bird. Wellnhofer's other work includes The Illustrated Encyclopedia of Pterosaurs from 1991.

Wellnhoferia, a bird closely related to Archaeopteryx, or a species of the Urvogel itself, was named in his honour in 2001. The pterosaur Wellnhopterus was named in his honour in 2021.

In 2007 a special meeting of pterosaur experts in Munich was dedicated to Wellnhofer, describing him as "the foremost authority on pterosaurs for the last four decades." The meeting produced a festschrift in his honour titled Flugsaurier: pterosaur papers in honour of Peter Wellnhofer.
