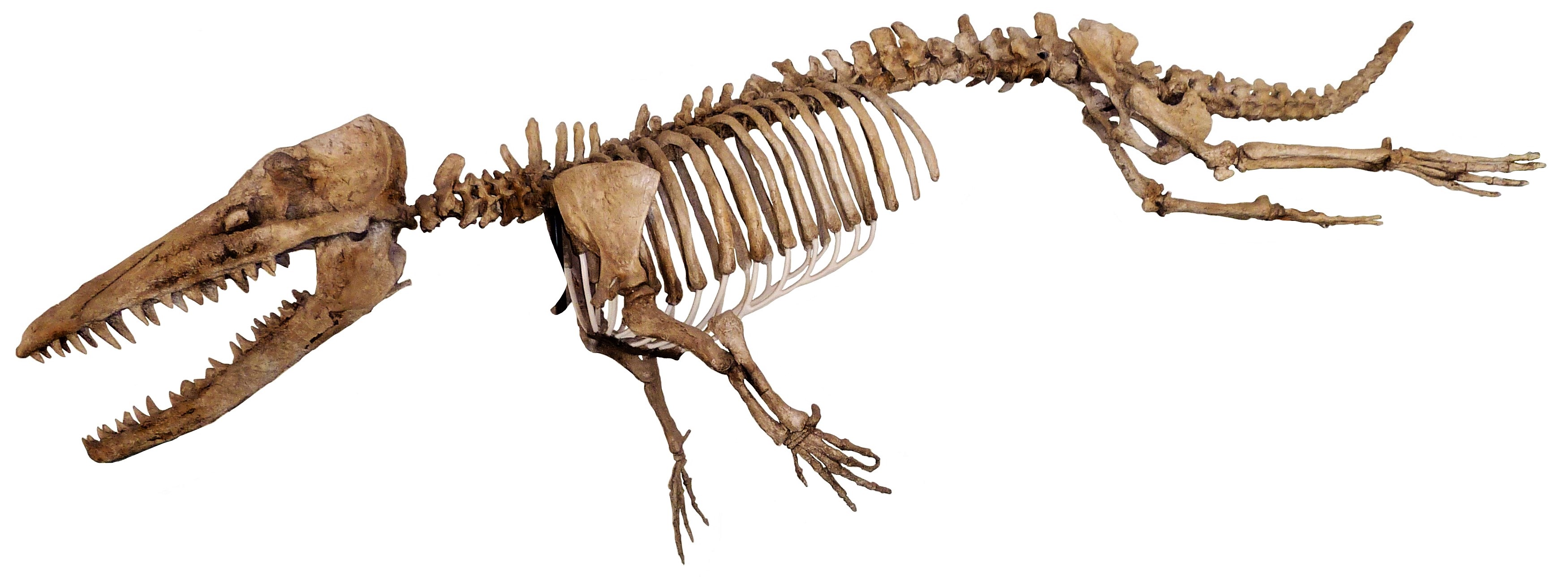
- Reconstructed skeleton at the Natural History Museum of the University of Pisa

Scientific classification
- Kingdom: Animalia
- Phylum: Chordata
- Class: Mammalia
- Infraclass: Placentalia
- Order: Artiodactyla
- Infraorder: Cetacea
- Family: †Ambulocetidae
- Genus: †Ambulocetus; Thewissen et al., 1994
- Species: †A. natans

Binomial name
- †Ambulocetus natans Thewissen et al., 1994

= Ambulocetus =

Ambulocetus Temporal range: Eocene (Lutetian), 48–47 Ma

Genus of extinct mammals

Ambulocetus (from Latin ambulō, meaning "to walk", and cetus, meaning "whale", and thus, "walking whale") is a genus of early semiaquatic cetacean (Note: an infraorder whose modern members are whales, dolphins, and porpoises) from the Kuldana Formation in Pakistan, roughly 48 or 47 million years ago during the Early Eocene (Lutetian). It contains one species, Ambulocetus natans (Latin natans "swimming"), known solely from one near-complete skeleton. Ambulocetus is among the best-studied of Eocene cetaceans, and serves as an instrumental find in the study of cetacean evolution and their transition from land to sea, as it was the first cetacean discovered to preserve a suite of adaptations consistent with an amphibious lifestyle. Ambulocetus is classified in the group Archaeoceti—the ancient forerunners of modern cetaceans whose members span the transition from land to sea—and in the family Ambulocetidae, which includes Himalayacetus and Gandakasia (also from the Eocene of the Indian subcontinent).

Ambulocetus had a narrow, streamlined body, and a long, broad snout, with eyes positioned at the very top of its head. Because of these features, it is hypothesised to have behaved much like a crocodile, waiting near the water's surface to ambush large mammals, using its powerful jaws to clamp onto and drown or thrash prey. Additionally, its ears possessed similar traits to modern cetaceans, which are specialised for hearing and detecting certain frequencies underwater, although it is unclear if Ambulocetus also used these specialised ears for hearing underwater. They may have instead been utilised for bone conduction on land, or perhaps served no function for early cetaceans.

It is thought to have swum much like a modern river otter, tucking in its forelimbs while alternating its hind limbs for propulsion, as well as undulating the torso and tail. It may have had webbed feet, and unlike its modern relatives, lacked a tail fluke. On land, Ambulocetus may have walked much like a sea lion.

Ambulocetus inhabited the Indian subcontinent during the Eocene. The area had a hot climate with tropical rainforests and coastal mangroves, and Ambulocetus may have predominantly inhabited brackish areas such as river mouths. It lived alongside requiem sharks, catfish and various other fishes, turtles, crocodiles, the amphibious hoofed mammal Anthracobune, and the fellow cetaceans Gandakasia, Attockicetus, Nalacetus, and Pakicetus.

== Taxonomy ==
=== Discovery ===
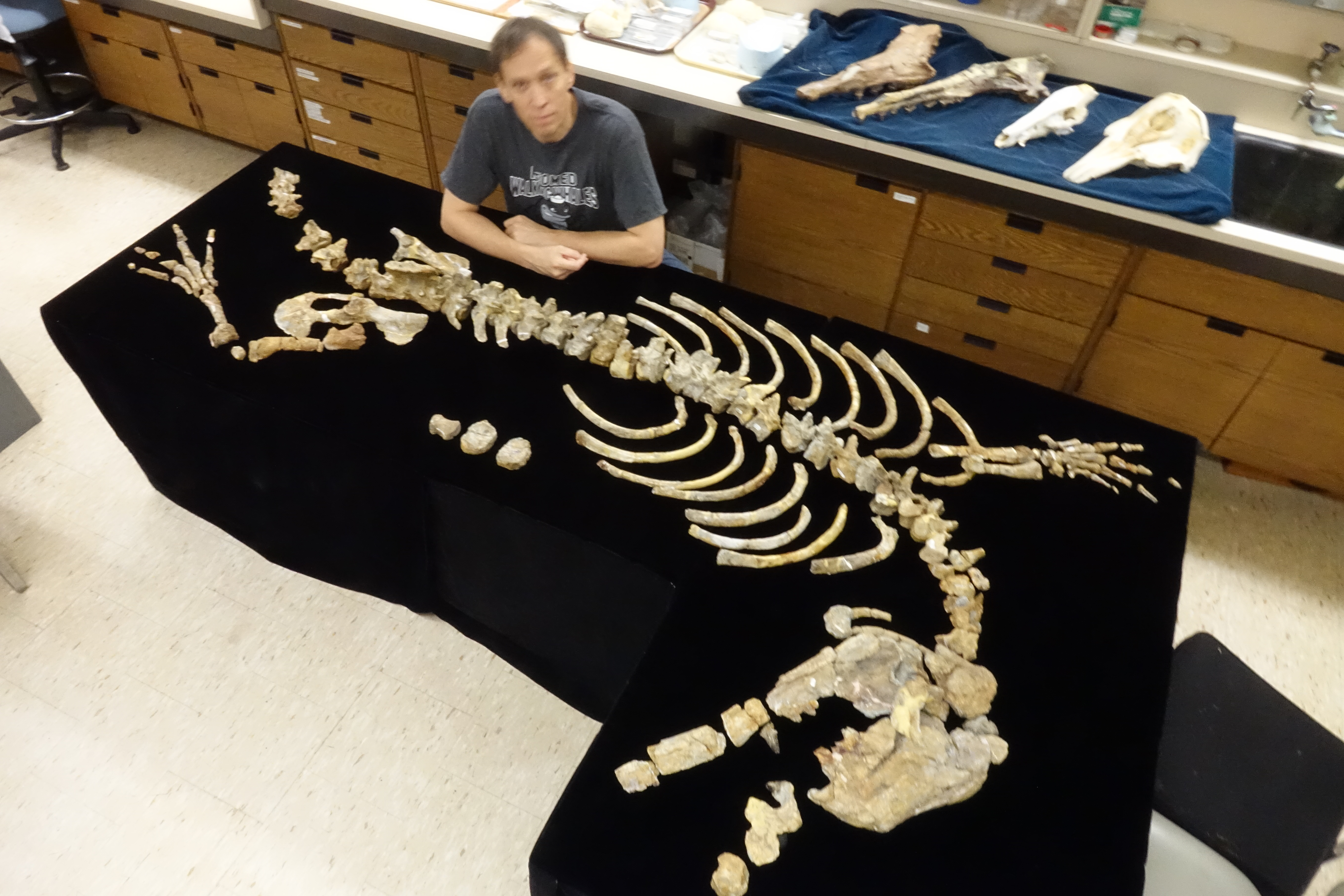
Hans Thewissen with the holotype Ambulocetus skeleton

In December 1991, Pakistani palaeontologist Mohammad Arif and Dutch–American palaeontologist Hans Thewissen were jointly funded by Howard University and the Geological Survey of Pakistan to recover land mammal fossils in the Kala Chitta Hills of Punjab, Pakistan. On 3 January 1992, they recovered a small, thick rib fragment. Later in the field season, while surveying the upper Kuldana Formation, Thewissen discovered a femur (thigh bone) and proximal portion of the tibia (upper portion of the shin) which clearly belonged to a mammal. An hour later, Arif discovered the rest of the skeleton, and the two began excavation the next day. At first, Thewissen speculated the fossils belonged to an anthracobunid (a large semi-aquatic mammal), until he found the teeth near the end of the field season, which were characteristically cetacean (living cetaceans are whales, dolphins, and porpoises). Thewissen, at the time, could not afford to excavate and store everything, so he took the skull with him to the United States, while Arif kept the rest in two crates which used to hold oranges. In October 1992, Thewissen presented his research of the skull to a vertebrate palaeontology convention in Toronto, Canada. The next year, American palaeontologist Philip D. Gingerich paid for the rest of the skeleton to be shipped to the United States. In 1994, the formal description of the remains was published by Thewissen, mammal palaeontologist Sayed Taseer Hussain, and Arif. They identified the remains as clearly belonging to an amphibious cetacean, and so they named it Ambulocetus natans. The genus name comes from Latin ambulare "to walk" and cetus "whale", and the species name natans "swimming".

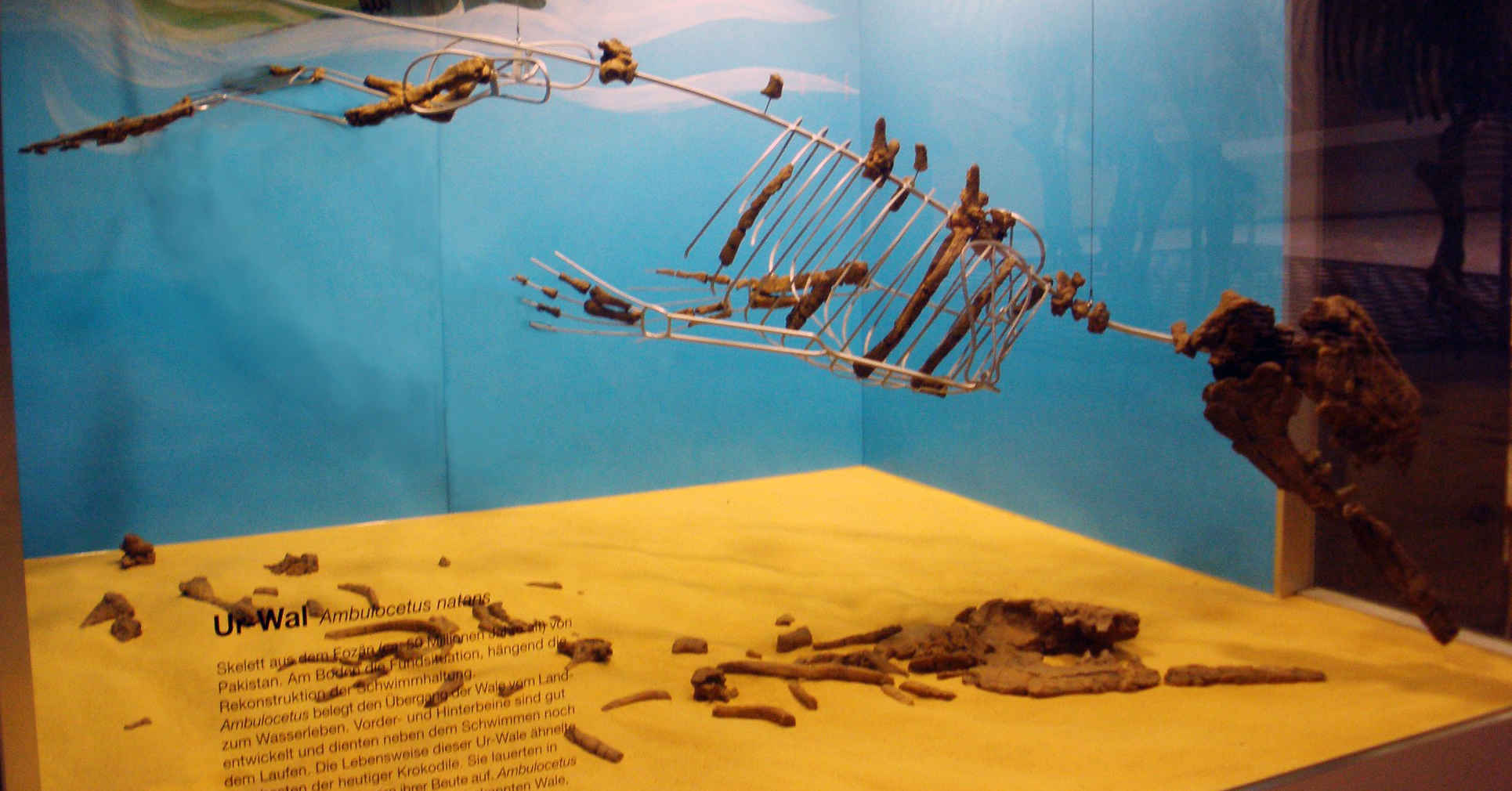
Ambulocetus holotype display arranged in original positions they were found on the ground and swimming posture above, at Naturmuseum Senckenberg, Frankfurt

The Kuldana Formation is constrained to sometime during the Lutetian stage of the Early Eocene, and the remains may date to 48–47 million years ago. The holotype specimen, HGSP 18507, is a partial skeleton initially discovered preserving an incomplete skull (missing the snout), some elements of the vertebral column and ribs, as well as portions of the fore- and hind-limb. Other specimens initially found were HGSP 18473 (a second premolar), HGSP 18497 (a third premolar), HGSP 18472 (a tail vertebra), and HGSP 18476 (lower portion of a femur). The holotype was found in a silt and mudstone bed over a 1.8 m^{2} (19 sq ft) area. Further excavation recovered most of the holotype's skeleton—most notably the hip, sacrum, and most of ribcage and thoracolumbar series (the spine excluding the neck, sacrum, and tail). These left the holotype about 80% complete by 2002, making it the most completely known cetacean from the time period. In 2009, some more elements of the holotype's jawbone were identified from a then-recently prepared matrix block.

Though it was known that cetaceans descended from land mammals before the discovery of Ambulocetus, the only evidence of this in the fossil record was the 52-million-year-old (fully terrestrial) Pakicetus and the Paleocene mesonychians (as there was a hypothesised link between cetaceans and mesonychians). The limbs of more aquatic Eocene cetaceans did not preserve very well. Ambulocetus demonstrated that cetaceans swam by flexing the spine up and down (undulation) before they had evolved the tail fluke, forelimb propulsion evolved relatively late, and that cetaceans went through an otter-like phase with spinal undulation and hindlimb propulsion. These had already been hypothesised to have occurred in the earliest aquatic cetaceans, but were impossible to test without more complete remains. The describers noted that, "Ambulocetus represents a critical intermediate between land mammals and marine cetaceans."

=== Classification ===
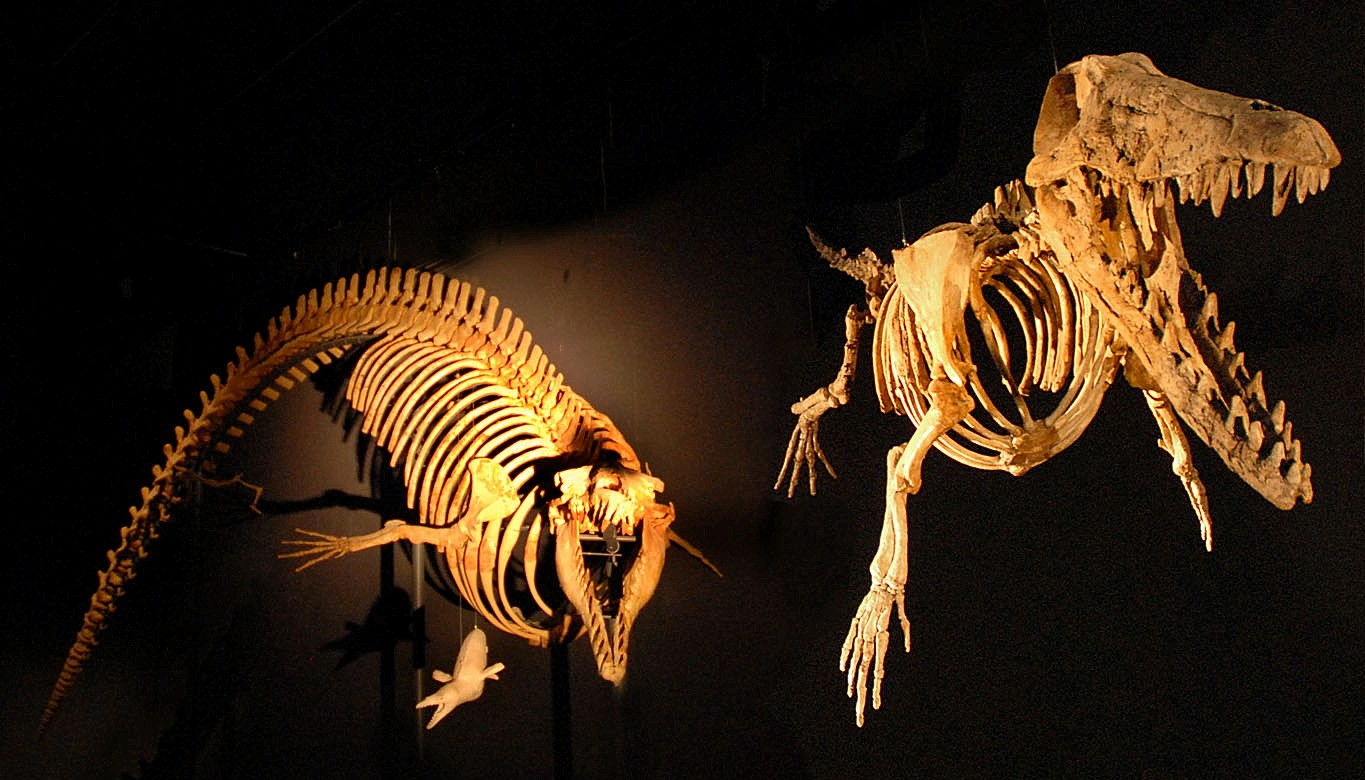
Reconstructed skeletons of Ambulocetus (right) and the fully aquatic basilosaurid Cynthiacetus (left) at the Muséum national d'histoire naturelle, Paris

Modern cetaceans (Neoceti) are grouped into either the parvorders Mysticeti (baleen whales) or Odontoceti (toothed whales). Neoceti are descended from the ancient Archaeoceti, whose members span the transition from terrestrial to fully aquatic. Archaeoceti are thus paraphyletic (it is a non-natural group which does not comprise both a common ancestor and all of its descendants). Ambulocetus was an archaeocete. By the time Ambulocetus was discovered, archaeocetes were classified into the families Protocetidae (which included what are now the terrestrial Pakicetidae, and the rest were amphibious), Remingtonocetidae (amphibious), Basilosauridae (aquatic), and Dorudontidae (aquatic, now a subfamily of Basilosauridae). The earliest cetaceans were thought to be the mesonychians, proposed before any firm early cetacean fossils were identified. In the original description, Ambulocetus was preliminarily placed into Protocetidae, until the further description of the holotype prompted Thewissen and colleagues to move it into its own family Ambulocetidae in 1996. At the same time, they also erected the family Pakicetidae. They also proposed that some members of Pakicetidae, Protocetidae, and Ambulocetidae were the other two archaeocete families' ancestors. They suggested that mesonychians gave rise to pakicetids, which gave rise to ambulocetids, which gave rise to both protocetids and remingtonocetids.

Though middle-to-late-Eocene archaeocetes are also known from North America, Europe, and Africa, most of these are found only on the Indian subcontinent. Therefore, it is thought cetaceans originally evolved in that region. Based on molecular data, cetaceans are most closely allied with hippos (Whippomorpha), and they split approximately 54.9 million years ago. They are all placed in the order Cetartiodactyla alongside terrestrial even-toed ungulates (hoofed mammals). This puts mesonychians as a distant relative of cetaceans rather than an ancestor, and their somewhat similar morphology was possibly a result of convergent evolution. The oldest known cetacean is the ambulocetid Himalayacetus identified in 1998 and dated to 52.5 million years ago (predating the terrestrial pakicetids), though the exact dating of Himalayacetus and Pakicetus is debated. Ambulocetidae also includes Gandakasia. Himalayacetus and Gandakasia are known only from partial jaw fragments. Ambulocetidae are endemic to the Indian subcontinent, and span the early to middle Eocene.

Euungulata

- Euungulata
  - Outgroup
  - - Mesonychia
    - - Perissodactyla
      - Artiodactyla
        - Other Artiodactyla
        - Whippomorpha
          - Hippopotamidae
          - Cetacea
            - Pakicetidae
            - - Ambulocetidae
              - - Remingtonocetidae
                - - Protocetidae
                  - Pelagiceti
                    - Basilosauridae
                    - Neoceti
                      - - stem Neoceti
                        - - Mysticeti (baleen whales)
                          - Odontoceti (toothed whales)

Family tree according to American vertebrate palaeontologist Mark Uhen, 2010

== Description ==
=== Size ===
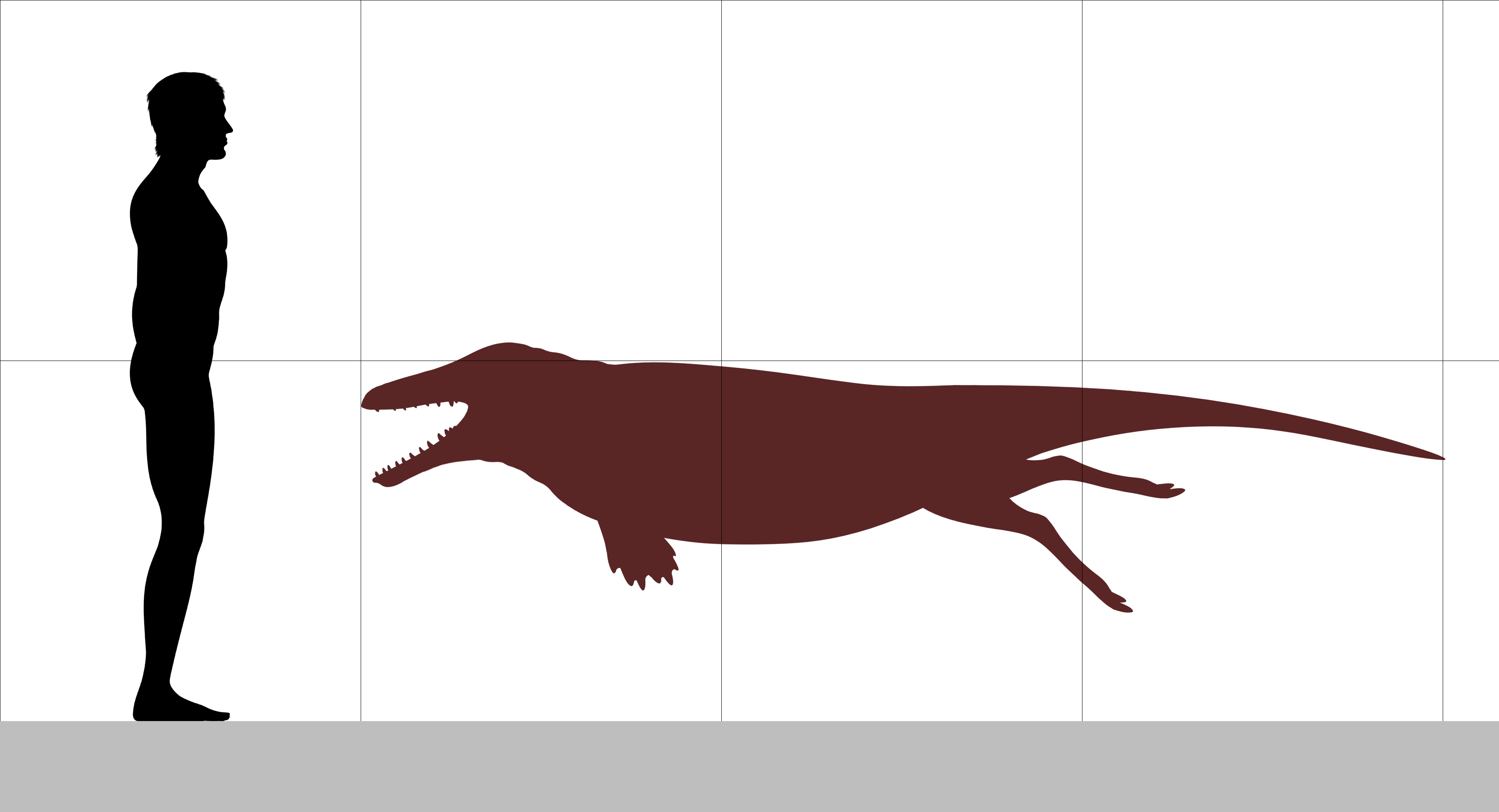
Ambulocetus next to a 180 cm (5 ft 11 in) tall man

Upon description, Thewissen and colleagues suggested the holotype specimen may have weighed the same as a male South American sea lion — about 300 kg (660 lb) — based on the size of the vertebrae, ribs, and limbs. They also estimated a length of roughly 300 cm (10 ft). For comparison, the holotype of Pakicetus attocki may have been 140 cm (4 ft 7 in) long. In 1996, they estimated weight of Ambulocetus, using the cross-sections of the long bones, as 141–235 kg (311–518 lb). Alternatively, they estimated about 250 kg (550 lb) by using the length of the second upper and lower molars compared to trends between this length and ungulate body mass. They obtained the same result comparing the skull size to those of similarly sized carnivores. In 1998, based on vertebral size, Gingerich estimated a body mass of 720 kg (1,590 lb). In 2013, Thewissen suggested that this may be an unreliable mass determinant as the vertebrae are unusually robust in Ambulocetus.

=== Skull ===
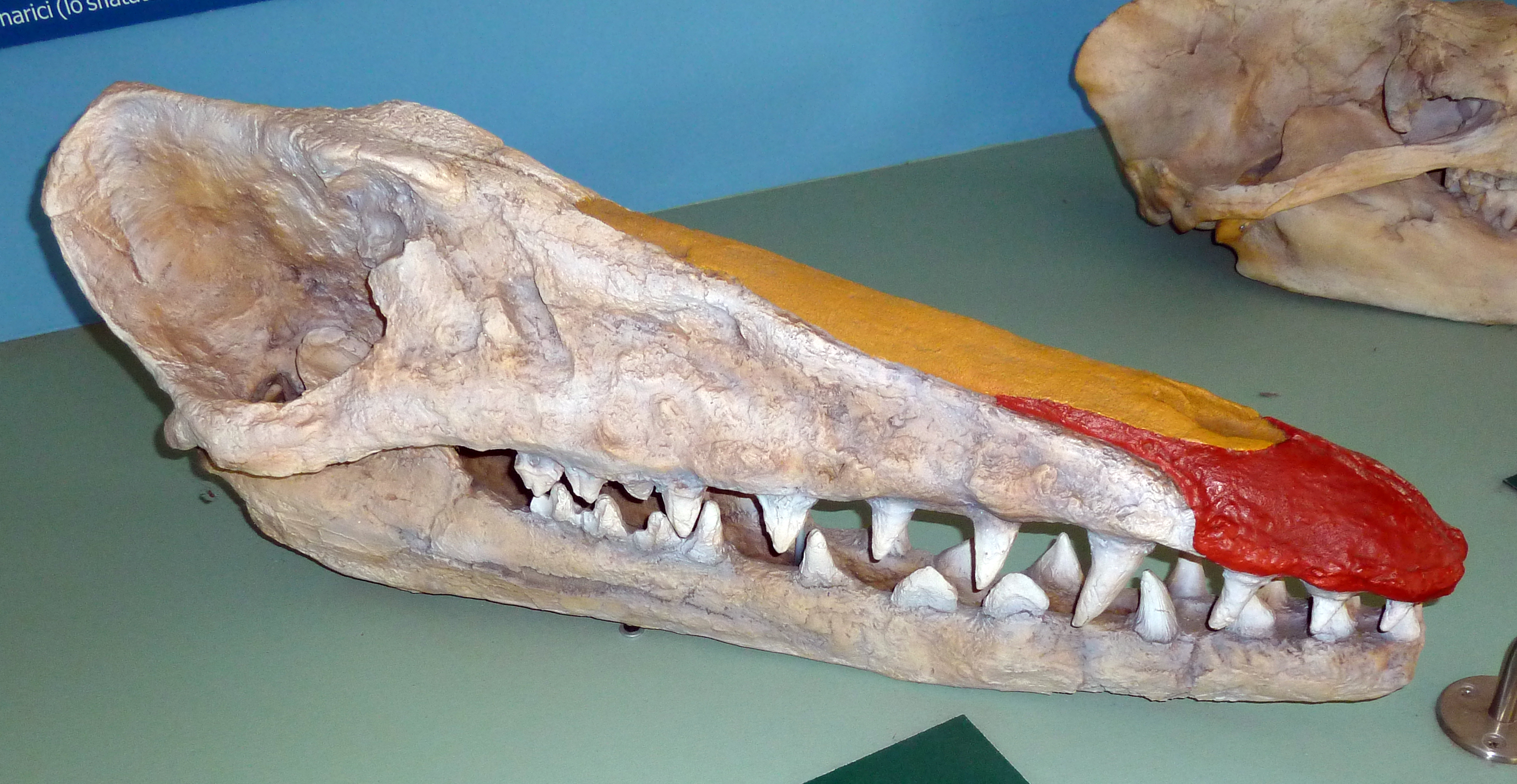
Reconstructed Ambulocetus skull at the Museo storia naturale di Pisa

Like other archaeocetes, the base of the skull has an undulating contour, probably related to the shape of the nasal canal (and its passage to the throat) and the narrow infraorbital region (the area below the eyes). The base of the skull is wide compared to other archaeocetes, more like that of modern cetaceans. The narrow infraorbital space, made of primarily the pterygoid processes, also occurs in Remingtonocetus and Pakicetus. The pterygoids connect as far back as the middle ear, much farther than other archaeocetes including the more ancient Pakicetus. Most modern cetaceans have a falcate (sickle-shaped) process which juts out prominently halfway between the hypoglossal canal and the ear; Ambulocetus has a similar process continuous of the pterygoid, but it runs alongside and behind the hypoglossal canal. Like many other archaeocetes, the pterygoids, sphenoids, and palatines form a wall lining the bottom of the nasal canal, which causes the palate to extend all the way to the ear. Like other cetaceans, Ambulocetus lacks the postglenoid foramen, which usually is one of the main passageways for veins into the skull in placental mammals. The ectotympanic bone which supports the eardrum is similar to that of Pakicetus, about as long as wide, whereas later archaeocetes have more elongate ectotympanics. The ectotympanics of all archaeocetes, nonetheless, are much different than those of terrestrial mammals. The ectotympanics of all cetaceans, including Ambulocetus, possess an involucrum (thickened lump of bone) at the medial lip. Unlike Pakicetus, but like later archaeocetes, the tympanic made close contact with the jaw. Like later archaeocetes, Ambulocetus seems to have possessed an air sinus in the pterygoids. It may have also had paranasal sinuses. The parietal bones on the braincase sides are more perpendicular than in Remingtonocetus, which makes the cheeks appear less flared. Like Remingtonocetus, Ambulocetus appears to have had a small brain.

The snout was quite broad, but the end of the holotype's snout is missing, so it is unclear how long it would have been. The snouts of Basilosaurus and Rodhocetus are short and make up about half the skull's length. Remingtonocetid snouts are quite narrow, which was clearly not the case for Ambulocetus. The mandibular symphysis of most mammals is restricted to the midline of the jaw, but extends much farther in archaeocetes; in Ambulocetus, it reaches the back end of the first premolar. Snout robustness and symphysis length suggest reinforcement of the jaw to withstand a strong bite force. Similarly, the strongest biting muscle in Ambulocetus seems to have been the temporalis muscle involved in biting down. Like other cetaceans, there are embrasure pits (a depression between the teeth), preserving the tooth positions for the fourth premolar, the first molar, and the third molar. Unlike later archaeocetes, the molars' roots do not extend to the cheek bones, and the third molar is not as nosewards as in remingtonocetids. The coronoid process of the mandible (where the lower jaw connects with the skull) in Ambulocetus is steep. In contrast, it is low and slopes gently down in basilosaurids and later cetaceans. The mandibular foramen opens below the coronoid process, and is around midway between terrestrial mammals and toothed whales in size. Like other cetaceans, the body of the hyoid bone (the basihyoid bone) is about as long as wide. Unlike other archaeocetes, the eyes are quite large and are placed near the top of the head facing upwards.

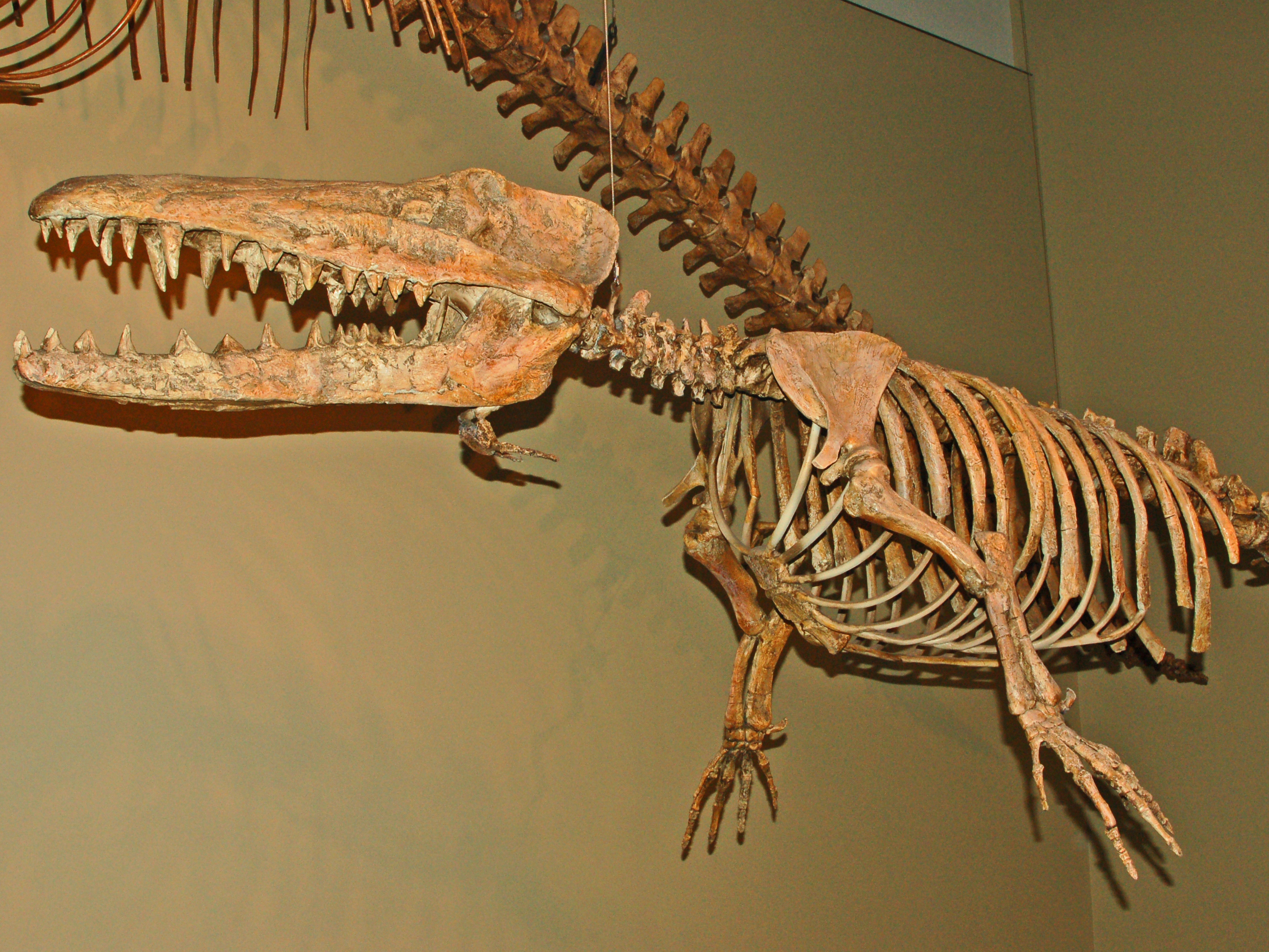
Reconstructed Ambulocetus skeleton at the Canadian Museum of Nature, Ottawa

Unlike modern toothed whales which only have one kind of tooth (homodont), archaeocetes are heterodont. Judging by tooth root size, the lower canine was larger than the incisors. The teeth are more robust than those of Rodhocetus and Basilosaurus. The premolars were double rooted, whereas most archaeocetes have single-rooted first premolars. The enamel of the lower premolars is crenulated (has scalloped edges). The fourth premolar is a high triangular shape. Like other ancient cetaceans, and most pronouncedly in ambulocetids, the lower molars are shorter than the back premolars. The lower premolars are larger than those of Pakicetus and are separated by wider gaps (diastemata). The molars had distinct trigonid and talonid cusps (these cusps are lost in basilosaurids), and the upper molars were trituberculate like ancient archaeocetes and ancient placental mammals, meaning they had a large protocone, distinct paracone and metacone, and no accessory cusps. Later archaeocetes developed accessory cusps.

=== Ribs and vertebrae ===
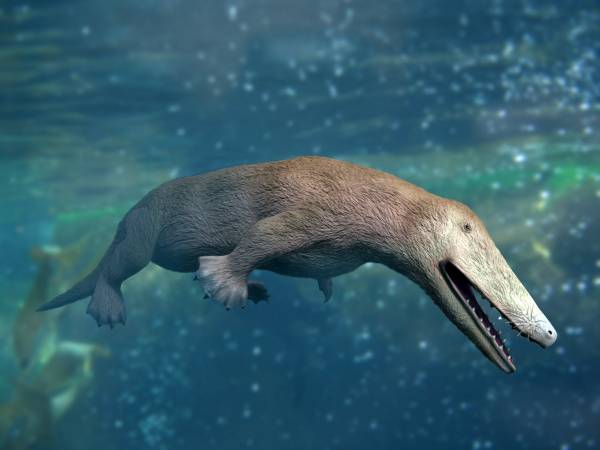
Restoration of Ambulocetus

The holotype preserved seven neck vertebrae, which are rather long at 3 cm (1.2 in). The 16 preserved thoracic vertebrae have thick spinous and transverse processes (which jut upwards and obliquely from the centrum, the vertebral body), with deep depressions on both sides at the tail-end of each centrum which may have supported strong longissimus muscles which flex the spine. The thoracic vertebrae become longer and wider tailwards and are tallest mid-series. In front-view (anterior aspect), the centra go from heart-shaped to kidney-shaped by T8 (the eighth thoracic vertebra). The pedicals (between the centrum and a transverse process) feature deep grooves. The spinous processes project tailwards from T1–T9, straight up at T10, headwards from T11 to T12, and the rest project straight up. The spinous processes progressively increase in length and width from T11–T16. T10 seems to have been at the level of the thoracic diaphragm. T1–T12 and T14 have capitular facets on the top margin of both the frontward and tailward side to join with the ribs. T15 and T16 have capitular facets on the headward side and lack transverse processes. T11–T15 have accessory anapophyses which jut straight up from the top border between the centrum and the transverse processes; and in T16, these are small, originate near the pedicles, and project tailwards. The width between articular processes (two masses of bone which jut out of each centrum to connect with the next centrum) continually increases through the thoracolumbar series. In life, it is possible it had up to 17 thoracic vertebrae.

The holotype preserves 26 ribs, though it is thought to have had 32 total in life. The cortical bone (the outermost layer) is thickest at the neck of the rib (between the joint and the costal cartilage), at max 1 mm (0.039 in), and was filled with spongy bone. That is, unlike many other aquatic mammals, the ribs did not exhibit osteosclerosis. They did exhibit pachyostosis, and were made thicker and heavier with additional layers of lamellar bone. The ribs' shape indicates Ambulocetus had a narrow and heart-shaped thorax looking at it head-on. Ribs are thickest at the T8–T10 level. Ribs are broadest at the sternum, which suggests strong sternocostal joints. The ribs have a slight S-curve in side view, with the rib heads angled headwards, and the sternocostal joints angled tailwards. The holotype preserves a central and a tailward sternum bone which are both exceedingly thick, about 27 mm (1.1 in) on the outer margins and decreasing towards the centre. The central sternum bone is longer and wider than the tailward one.

The eight preserved lumbar vertebrae at the lower back are much longer than the thoracic, and the centra and transverse processes, from L1–L7, continually increase in length and height. The short transverse processes on L8 are probably due to its proximity to the ilium on the hip. The undersides are concave. The spinous processes are long and tall, and project headward from L1–L5, and straight-up from L6–L8. The spinous processes are bulbous on the tailward side to support epaxial muscles. The vertebral laminae are excavated headward to support the interspinous ligaments which connect the spinous processes. The vertebrae are about as robust as those of modern pinniped such as sow leopard seals and bull walruses. The postzygapophyses (the surface where the vertebrae join with each other) is flat rather than revolute, which would have made the series more flexible than that of terrestrial relatives.

For the four preserved sacral vertebrae (at the sacrum, between the pelvic bones), the transverse processes of S1 are smaller than those of L8. There is a robust sacroiliac joint with the hip. For the spinous processes, those of S1–S3 are fused. Metapophyses jut straight up from each lamina near the joint, progressively getting smaller with each vertebra.

Only five of the tail (caudal) vertebrae are preserved: a possible C1 or C2, a possible C3, a possible C4, a possible C7, and a possible C8. The more headward tail vertebrae have thick transverse processes, whereas those of the middle tail vertebrae are longer than broad. The C3 has a narrow spinous process and is mostly columnar, but the tailward side is broader. The C4 is more columnar. The C7 and C8 are columnar and taper off tailward, and the neural canal where the central nervous system runs through is still present. In life, Ambulocetus possibly had upwards of 20 tail vertebrae like some mesonychians. If correct, then Ambulocetus would have had a lot fewer and a lot longer tail vertebrae than modern cetaceans.

=== Limbs and girdles ===
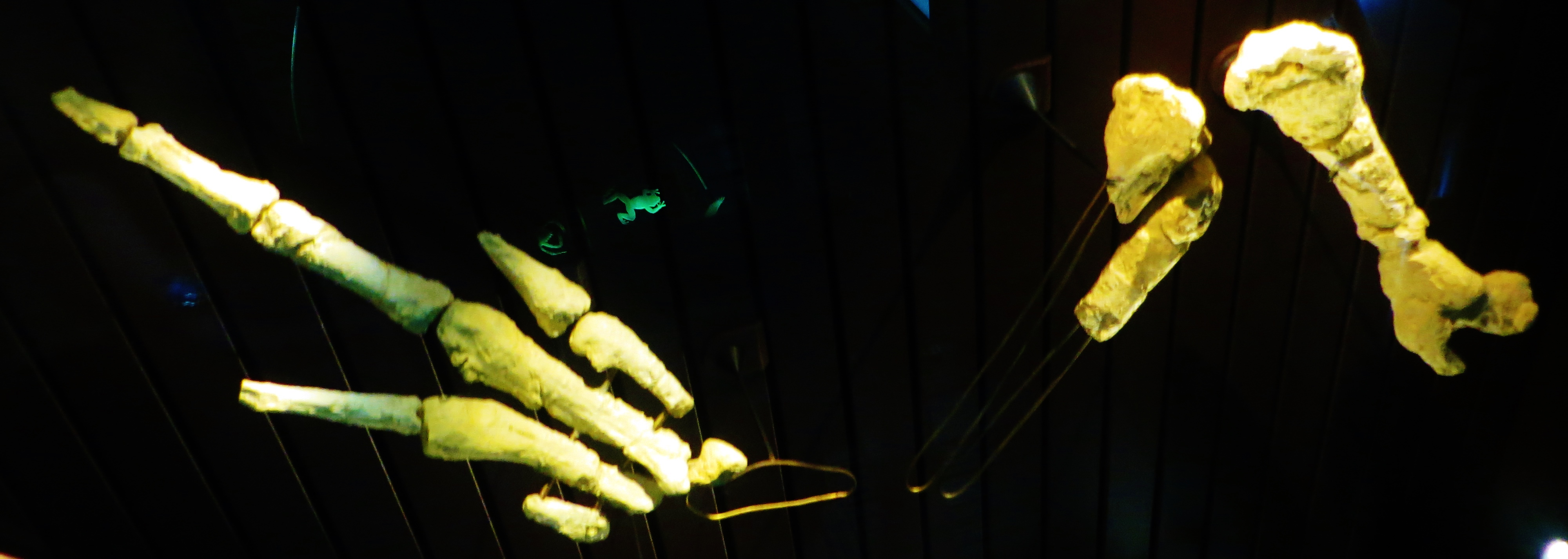
Ambulocetus hindlimb at the Muséum national d'histoire naturelle, Paris

Unlike modern cetaceans, Ambulocetus had functional legs which could support the animal's bodyweight on land. The holotype has a robust radius and ulna (the forearm bones). The forearm measures 17 cm (6.7 in) in length. The head of the radius is somewhat triangular, which probably means the forearm was locked in a semi-pronated position (the palms were orientated towards the ground). The olecranon, which formed part of the elbow joint, makes up about a third of the ulna's length and is inclined tailwards, which would have allowed the triceps to more forcefully flex the elbow. The wrist bones indicate a strong flexor carpi ulnaris muscle for wrist flexion. The hand had five widely spaced digits. The first metacarpal (which is in the thumb) is 5.2 cm (2.0 in) long, the second 7.6 cm (3.0 in), the third 10.5 cm (4.1 in), the fourth 10.2 cm (4.0 in), and the fifth 6.39 cm (2.52 in). Like modern beaked whales, the thumb is short and slender.

The ilium of the hip of Ambulocetus, like remingtonocetids, features deep depressions to support the rectus femoris and the gluteal muscles. Unlike terrestrial mammals and protocetids, the ischium is expanded dorsolaterally (from left to right, and upwards), which would have increased lever arm for thigh and leg retractor muscles when extended, such as while swimming. This would have also increased the surface area of the gemelli muscles (hip rotators which stabilise the hip) and the tail muscles. The widening of the ischium may have also given Ambulocetus a more streamlined and hydrodynamic body. Ambulocetus had a pubic symphysis connecting the two pubic bones at the base of the pelvis together, which indicates the animal could support its own weight on land. The modern cetacean pubis bone lacks this and only functions to anchor abdominal and urogenital muscles.

The leg proportions of Ambulocetus are similar to otters and seals, and American mammalogist Alfred Brazier Howell predicted similar proportions for a transitional cetacean in 1930. The femur measures 29 cm (11 in), a length similar to the presumably cursorial (capable of running) mesonychian Pachyaena. Archaeocete femora are generally much shorter. The femoral head is spherical and, at maximum, has a width of 3.86 cm (1.52 in), similar to Indocetus but much larger than mesonychians and Rodhocetus. The trochanteric fossa, supporting the lateral rotator group at the hip, is quite deep, but other than this, the femur does not seem to have supported particularly strong extensor or flexor muscles. The femoral condyles of Ambulocetus are quite long compared to those of other archaeocetes and mesonychians, suggesting the knee was capable of hyperflexion (bending). The tibia is overall similar to those of mesonychians. The feet are huge, probably longer than the femur. The toes are also relatively long, with the fourth digit measuring 17 cm (6.7 in) in length. The fifth digit is slightly shorter and much less robust than the fourth. The phalanges of the toes are short, and end with a convex hoof. Like seals, the phalanges of both the hands and feet are flattened, which may have streamlined them to allow for webbed feet.

== Palaeobiology ==
=== Diet ===
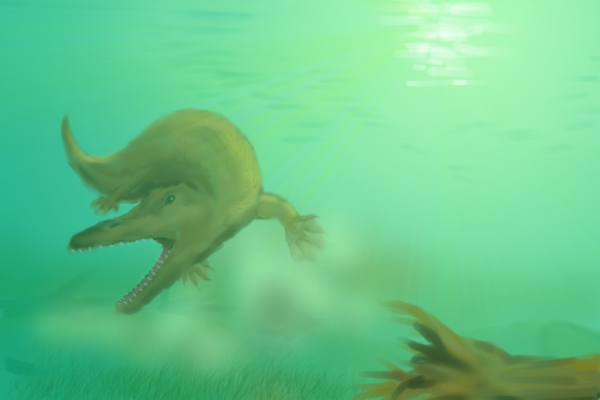
Restoration of Ambulocetus

The robustness of the cheek teeth, as well as the cusp arrangement, suggests they were involved in crushing, and the fact that both the premolars and molars were involved in crushing indicates Ambulocetus required a large area for crushing, such as when biting into large prey items. Similarly, the broad and powerful snout makes it unlikely it was pursuing small, quick prey items (which would have required a narrow snout like dolphins or gharials). The snout was also long, which may have precluded the ability to crush bone because it would have had reduced structural integrity at the tip. The anatomy of the cheek teeth resembles those of Mesozoic marine reptiles which fed on armoured fish, large fish, reptiles, and ammonites, and the teeth may have been used to grip onto prey firmly. Therefore, Thewissen suggested Ambulocetus was most likely an ambush predator, the jaw adapted to handle struggling prey. The unusually deep pterygoids potentially functioned to dissipate force while the prey was struggling.

The eyes of Ambulocetus were placed on the top of the head, similar to crocodiles and other animals that prefer to keep most of their body submerged with the eyes peeking out of the water. The nasal canal has bony walls extending into the throat, much like in crocodiles where they keep the nasal airways open while the animal is killing prey either by drowning it or thrashing it around. Pieces of prey are subsequently torn off by forceful, thrashing head and body motions, the feet anchoring the crocodile in place. Thewissen believed Ambulocetus used a similar feeding tactic, though Ambulocetus was probably capable of chewing, unlike crocodiles. Ambulocetus may have attacked large mammals which approached the water's edge, and semi-aquatic mammals including early (possibly herbivorous) sirenians (now manatees and the dugong) and the probably amphibious anthracobunids. These two seem to have been rather common on the coasts of the Indian subcontinent, which could mean they were regular prey items. Since Ambulocetus was found in marine deposits (where animals would not come to drink), it is possible it hunted in river deltas which were recorded in the Kuldana Formation. Ambulocetus probably went after fish and reptiles when given the opportunity, though it may not have had the agility to commonly catch them.

=== Locomotion ===
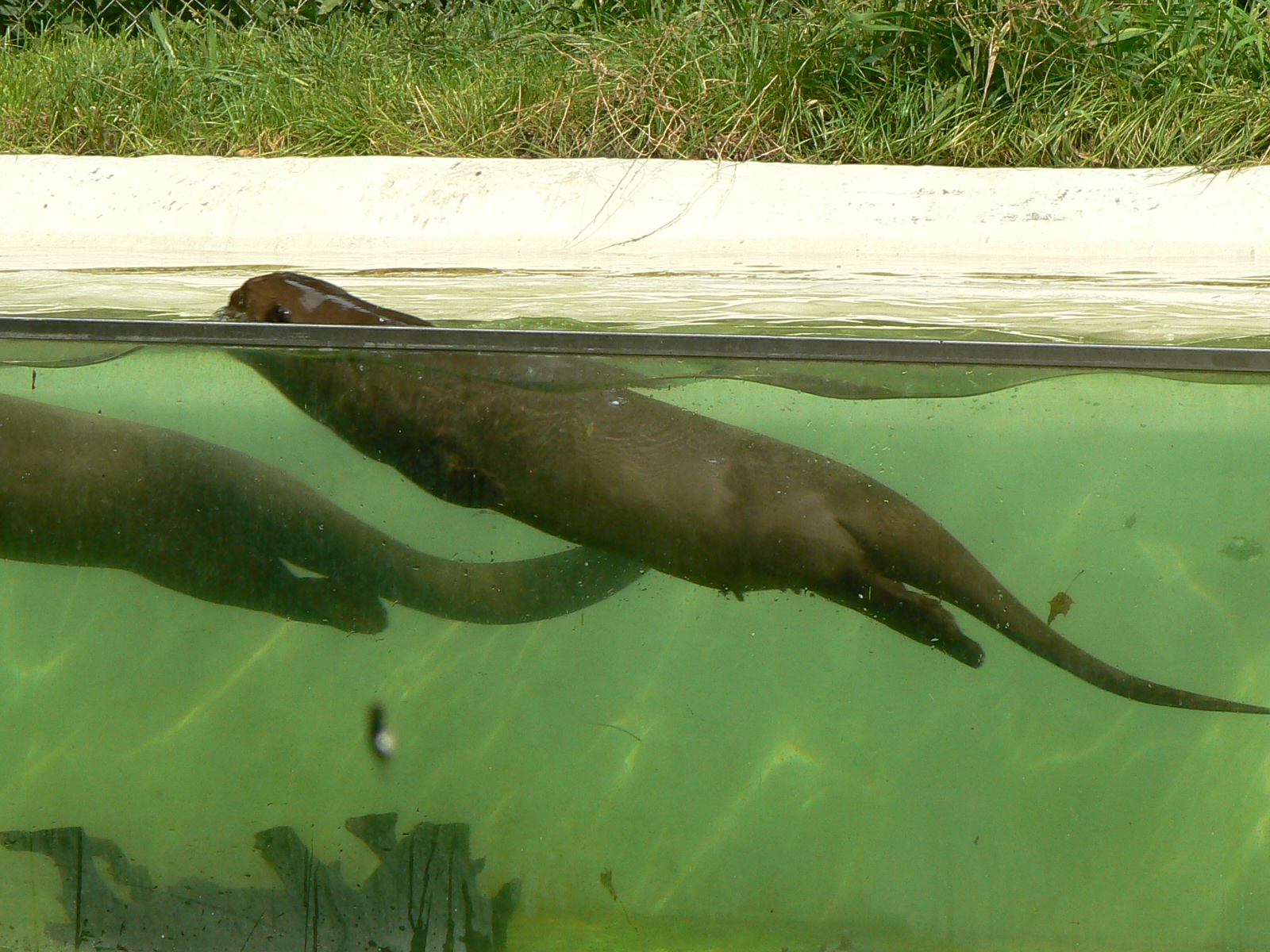
Ambulocetus may have swum like otters (above: giant otter swimming at Tierpark Hagenbeck)

Thewissen hypothesised that Ambulocetus was a drag-powered swimmer, and used its huge feet as its primary propulsion mechanism, much like modern river otters including the giant otter, and species in the genera Lontra and Lutra. Based on the length of the known tail vertebrae, Ambulocetus may have had an inflexible tail, which would have made the tail an inefficient primary propulsion mechanism due to poorer lever arm (modern cetaceans have relatively short tail vertebrae). Ambulocetus therefore likely did not have a tail fluke. Nonetheless, drag powered swimmers still have powerful tails for producing lift, and the tails of river otters are 125% the size of the thoracolumbar series. So, using river otters as a model, Ambulocetus was a pelvic paddler—swimming with alternating beats of the hindlimbs (without engaging the forelimbs)—and also undulated (moved up and down) its tail while swimming. Like the sea otter, pelvic paddling may have been done at the surface to move at slow or moderate speeds. At higher speeds fully submerged, undulation of the spine would have become more prominent, though the feet still would have acted as the primary propulsion mechanism.

Based on the pelvis and robust forelimbs, Thewissen believed Ambulocetus was capable of venturing onto land, and was more efficient at doing this than remingtonocetids and protocetids (it is unclear if the latter two were capable of bearing weight on the limbs). Ambulocetus possibly used a sprawling gait on land, similar to modern sea lions. In 2016, Japanese biologists Konami Ando and Shin-ichi Fujiwara performed a statistical test of ribcage strength among terrestrial, semi-aquatic, and fully aquatic mammals, and found that Ambulocetus clustered with fully aquatic mammals, because they assigned a very high rib density on par with fully aquatic sirenians which use their heavy, osteosclerotic ribs as ballast. They then concluded Ambulocetus could not walk on land, but cautioned the study was limited by a lack of information on the exact density of the bone, the location of the centre of mass, and the reliance of false ribs for thoracic support.

=== Hearing ===
Modern cetaceans have highly specialised ear bones to hear underwater as well as to detect certain frequency ranges. Unlike most other mammals, cetacean ear bones are comparatively thick, and so preserve more reliably in the fossil record. Modern cetaceans have air sinuses surrounding the ear bones (peritympanic sinuses), which acoustically isolate the ear by reflecting sound moving through the head and interrupting both bony and fleshy connections of the ear to the skull. Like later archaeocetes, Ambulocetus had at least one such sinus between the tympanic bone and the skull base. The evolution of these sinuses also seems to have caused some restructuring of the skull base due to the development of bony walls surrounding the sinuses. The ectotympanic of all cetaceans, including Pakicetus and Ambulocetus, has a bony growth (involucrum) on the medial lip speculated to aid in the detection of low-frequency sounds. All cetaceans also have a vertical crest ("sigmoid process") right in front of the ear canal, which is speculated to be related to the increasing size of the malleus bone in the middle ear.

As for the outer ear, terrestrial mammals channel sound in via an ear canal, but those of modern cetaceans are either narrowed or completely plugged, the sound being picked up (at least for toothed whales) by a fat pad in the lower jaw running to the ectotympanic bone. The mandibular foramen size can determine the size of the fat pad, and that of Ambulocetus is larger than that of Pakicetus and terrestrial mammals, but is smaller than later archaeocetes and toothed whales. Nonetheless, a lot of the change to the external auditory apparatus occurred between Pakicetus and Ambulocetus. These early archaeocetes may have developed such an external ear to either: better hear underwater; facilitate bone conduction of vibrations on dry land as some low-lying terrestrial creatures do (namely turtles and subterranean mole rats); or it was non-functional, and the malleus and jawbone (which are connected in the embryo stage of mammals) happened to stop separating.

== Palaeoecology ==
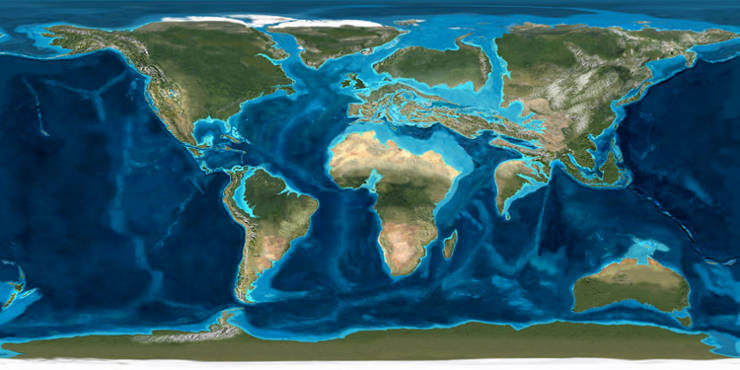
Map of the Earth 50 million years ago around when Ambulocetus existed

During the Eocene, the Indian subcontinent was an island just beginning its collision with Asia which would eventually lead to the uprising of the Himalayas. The Eocene had a greenhouse climate (no permanent ice sheets at the poles) as opposed to the icehouse climate of today, so, in general, areas were much warmer. The abundance of Eocene brown coal deposits preserving tropical biota on the Indian subcontinent indicates the proliferation of tropical rainforests in a hot climate. Mangroves seem to have commonly grown along the subcontinent's western margin in the Early Eocene but decreased nearing the Middle Eocene Climatic Optimum (a warming trend). The waters off the western coast seem to have featured upwelling and low oxygen.

The holotype was identified in the upper level of the Kuldana Formation at Locality 9209, which features green mud and silt as well as a bed of marine shells, including marine snails (such as Turritella) and bivalves. It was likely a coastal area. A redbed underlies this layer, followed by grey, green, and purple freshwater mud, silts, sandstones, and limestone. These beds alternate with showing marine deposits. The holotype was found in green mud. Near Locality 9209, the formation begins with 10 m (33 ft) of grey and green mud, silt, and sandstone, containing two bivalve beds. The first often stretches only one shell, whereas the second stretches 50 cm (20 in) down, and the formation terminates with a 1-metre-thick (3.3 ft) bed before transitioning to the younger Kohat Formation. The holotype was found a few decimeters above the second bed.

The area may have formed in a shallow sea off the shores of a coastal swamp or forest. The only other vertebrate remains found at the 9209 locality was a (now lost) reptile scute. Other localities of the upper level of the formation have yielded remains of requiem sharks, the fish Stephanodus, catfish, turtles, crocodiles, and the anthracobunid Anthracobune pinfoldi. Other archaeocetes from the formation are: the ambulocetid Gandakasia, the remingtonocetid Attockicetus, and the pakicetids Nalacetus, Pakicetus calcis, and P. chittas. Stable carbon and oxygen isotope analysis indicates Ambulocetus inhabited brackish waters (part fresh and part salt water), possibly at a river mouth.

== See also ==
- Evolution of cetaceans
- Ice Hunt — novel by James Rollins featuring Ambulocetus
- Walking With Beasts — BBC documentary series featuring Ambulocetus
