= Chaudry Mohammad Aslam =

Pakistani mathematician

- Born: 1900; Amritsar, Punjab, British Indian Empire
- Died: 1965 (aged 64–65); Islamabad, Pakistan
- Citizenship: Pakistani
- Education: Punjab University, Lahore
- Known for: Cartography and thematic cartography
- Scientific career
- Fields: Mathematics
- Workplaces: Geological Survey of Pakistan; Surveyor General of Pakistan; Survey of India; British Indian Civil Service (BICS)] Khalsa College, Amritsar (KCM)

Prof Chaudry Mohammad Aslam (1900–1965) was a Pakistani mathematician and renowned cartographer. He was the surveyor general of Pakistan who was instrumental in the demarcation of the borders of the then newly established Islamic Republic of Pakistan.

== Early life and education ==
He was born in British India in 1900 and was initially educated in Amritsar and Lahore, Punjab. He graduated and received his D.Sc. in mathematics, and gained specialisation in Cartography, from Punjab University, Lahore; he became a full professor of mathematics at Khalsa College, Amritsar.

His older brother Mohammad Sadiq (son of Murad Bux) was one of the victims of the British Jallianwala Bagh Massacre in Amritsar in 1919.

== Surveyor General of Pakistan ==
He became an officer in the British Indian Civil Service in the 1920s and joined the Survey of India. His contribution to the mapping of the troubled North West Frontier province in 1930s was rewarded by the bestowment of the title of Khan Bahadur by the British in 1946. On the independence and partition of British India he led various survey missions to map the new dominions of East and West Pakistan, the borders of which were disputed in a number of areas.

He was responsible for the demarcation of the border with Persia. As a result of this he was awarded the Nishan-i-Humayun by the Shah of Iran, Mohammad Reza Pahlavi. He subsequently rose to the rank of Surveyor General of Pakistan. He was called to chair the boundary commission between Pakistan and China in 1963 that lead to a historic boundary agreement being signed between the two countries on 2 March 1963 at the Great Hall of the People, Beijing (then Peking). His delegation was hosted by Chairman Mao Zedong and Premier Zhou Enlai. Much of this boundary remains disputed by the government of India. An account of the signing of the Sino-Pak boundary agreement (including 2 photographs of C M Aslam) has been given by Qudrat Ullah Shahab in his famous book: Shahab Nama. A picture of Chaudry at the Survey of Pakistan Office can be found in the December 1951 issue of National Geographic Magazine (USA).

== See also ==
- Sino-Pakistan Agreement
