= Karl Beurlen =

German paleontologist

- Born: 17 April 1901; Aalen, German Empire
- Died: 27 December 1985 (aged 84); Tübingen, West Germany
- Scientific career
- Fields: Geology; Paleontology

Karl Theodor Beurlen (17 April 1901 – 27 December 1985) was a German paleontologist. Beurlen was a prolific researcher on invertebrate paleontology, and is credited with publishing over 200 papers, with important contributions to the paleontology and stratigraphy of both Germany and Brazil. He held several important positions in geological societies and institutions in Germany in the 1930s and 1940s.

Beurlen's paleontological legacy is overshadowed by his political conviction in national socialism. Beurlen was an associate member of the SS as early as 1931, co-founded a Nazi-aligned scientific journal (the ZGN) in 1935, and was named to the Reichsforschungsrat (Reich Research Council) in 1939. During the Second World War, Beurlen served as the director of the Palaeontological Museum, Munich. Beurlen's belief that the Luftwaffe would protect German cities from Allied bombings during the war, and his aggressive refusal to move the museum's collections to safety outside of the city, is today blamed for the near-total destruction of the museum's paleontological collection in the 1944 bombing of Munich. The destroyed fossils included several scientifically important specimens, including the original material of Spinosaurus and Aegyptosaurus.

Beurlen was dismissed from his positions after the war, and worked as a paleontologist and geologist in Brazil in 1950–1969. He retired in 1969 and returned to Germany, where he wrote a series of popular science books on geology and paleontology.

== Biography ==
=== Early life and career ===
Karl Theodor Beurlen was born in Aalen on 17 April 1901. He was the son of an elementary school teacher. Beurlen's interest in natural science began at an early age, and by the time of his school years he collected and identified plants, beetles, and butterflies. Beurlen's paleontological interest was influenced by his grandfather's interest in the subject. In his later life, Beurlen claimed that he had chosen to pursue natural science "with a heavy heart", since he was also interested in linguistics and philosophy.

Beurlen attended University of Tübingen. He completed a PhD in 1923, in invertebrate paleontology. Early in his career, Beurlen worked as an assistant of Edwin Hennig, with whom he published a dissertion on ammonites. Beurlen then worked as an assistant at the University of Tübingen. After his marriage in 1925, Beurlen worked at the University of Königsberg. Beurlen was a prolific author of paleontology papers, having published more than 200 papers on a variety of groups, including ammonites, decapods, and echinoids. In 1934, Beurlen was appointed to the board of the Geological-Paleontological Institute of the University of Kiel.

Beurlen was a proponent of orthogenesis (a now discredited hypothesis on evolution) and saltational evolution. He used the term metakinesis (coined by Otto Jaekel) to describe sudden changes of development in organisms. He also invented the term palingenesis as a mechanism for his orthogenetic theory of evolution. Beurlen's 1923 paper Form and Function in Organic Development was the first fully fledged theory on saltational evolution published by a German paleontologist.

=== Political involvement ===
Beurlen became an associate member of the SS in 1931, and joined the NSDAP in 1933. In his unpublished autobiography, Beurlen claimed the he had "unwillingly been drawn into political activities".

During Beurlen's time at the University of Kiel, the president of the university was Karl Lothar Wolf (president 1933–1935), who encouraged national socialism among the staff. Beurlen, Wolf, and other likeminded staff founded a new scientific journal in 1935, the Zeitschrift für die gesamte Naturwissenschaft: einschliesslich Naturphilosophie und Geschichte der Naturwissenschaft und Medizin (or ZGN). "Gesamte Naturwissenschaft" ("the entirity of natural science") was understood by the founders to apply to "Aryan science", and Beurlen envisioned the journal as one that would conform to the lived experiences of the German people. From 1937 onwards, the journal was under the direction of the "Reich Student Leader" Gustav Adolf Scheel. Although Beurlen was no longer actively involved with running the project at that time, he continued to serve as a member of the editorial board. Under Scheel, the journal was officially branded as a "kampforgan" (platform; organ of struggle) for "all active scientists in the fight against all influences alien to the German race and for a science that is rooted in the German soul".

In a 1936 opinion piece in the Zeitschrift der Deutschen Geologischen Gesellschaft, Beurlen wrote that geology should be considered the first among equals of the natural sciences, since geology provided the foundation that allowed the formation of the Lebensgestaltung (German lifestyle), and for the development of the Lebensraum (German territory). Beurlen further believed that geology should serve as the basis of local natural history education, since it united geography and folklore in such a way that it emphasized the unity of Blod und Boden ("blood and soil").

=== Career in Nazi Germany ===
==== Research positions ====
In 1936, Beurlen founded the Arbeitsgruppe nationalsozialistischer Hochschullehrer ("Working-Group of National-Socialist University Docents"). Later in the same year, he was admitted to the board of the German Geological Society at the request of the Arbeitsgruppe. On 16 July 1938, Beurlen was elected as the president of the German Geological Society, with 68 out of 79 votes. On 1 March 1939, Beurlen announced the union of the Austrian Viennese Geological Society with the German one (as the junior society Alpenländischer Geologisher Verein), following Nazi Germany's annexation of Austria in the previous year. Beurlen presided over the meetings of both societies, and was made a honorary member of the Viennese Geological Society in 1940, likely for political reasons. Beurlen retained his honorary membership of the Viennese Geological Society (later renamed the Austrian Geological Society) to the end of his life. Some later biographers erroneously claim that Beurlen was also elected as the chairman of the German Paleontological Society (Deutsche Palaeontologische Gesellschaft) in 1938. During Beurlen's time in the Paleontological Society in the 1930s and 1940s, it was instead Johannes Weigelt, and later Otto Schindewolf, who served as chairmen.

In 1937, Beurlen was admitted to the German National Academy of Sciences Leopoldina. Also in 1937, he became a member of the Reichsforschungsrat (Reich Research Council), as Fachspartenleiter Bodenforschung ("referee for soil sciences").

==== Director of the Palaeontological Museum, Munich ====
In 1941, Beurlen succeeded Ferdinand Broili as the director of the Bavarian State Collection for Palaeontology and Geology (the modern-day Palaeontological Museum, Munich) and as the professor of paleontology and historical geology at the Ludwig-Maximilians-Universität München (at the time also known as the University of Munich). Beurlen continued to hold both positions until the end of the Second World War in 1945.

Despite German setbacks in the war, Beurlen believed that the Allies would not be able to bomb German cities because of the Luftwaffe. Beurlen aggressively blocked efforts from museum staff to move the collections of the Bavarian State Collection to safety outside the city; taking such precautions was seen as a lack of loyalty to the Führer, and a lack of confidence in Germany's capability to win the war. Ernst Stromer, who had discovered several scientifcally important fossils in Egypt that were kept at the museum (including the original material of Spinosaurus and Aegyptosaurus), attempted to convince Beurlen to move the paleontological collection out of the city. Beurlen threatened to report Stromer to the authorities and have him sent to a concentration camp. Much of the museum's collections, including almost the entire paleontological collection, was destroyed in an allied bombing on 24–25 April, 1944. Parts of the collections were saved through covert efforts by curators of the museum, including Edgar Dacqué, against Beurlen's wishes and orders. Most of the museum's geological collection, easier to transport than the fossils, was covertly saved by the curator Therese zu Oettingen-Spielberg.

=== Post-war life and career ===
Beurlen was dismissed as director of the Bavarian State Collection, and from his other positions, after the war. He attempted to regain his position at the Ludwig-Maximilians-Universität München during denazification and asked for a letter of recommendation from the physicist Arnold Sommerfeld. Sommerfeld declined, arguing that Beurlen had been a "more than willing collaborator" of the Nazis. With little possibility of academic employment, Beurlen did not do any scientific work for half a decade. He worked as a construction worker for a few years to support his family.

In 1950, Beurlen was invited by the Brazilian Geological Survey in Rio de Janeiro to assist in research on the stratigraphy and paleontology of the Panama Basin. Beurlen spent over a decade in Brazil, and did prolific paleontological and stratigraphic work in the country. He became a professor at the University of Recife in 1959. After the 1964 Brazilian coup d'état, Beurlen felt that conditions had worsened in Brazil. He retired from his professorial position in 1969 and returned to Germany, settling in Tübingen.

After his retirement, Beurlen wrote popular science books on fossils and geology, such as Geologie von Brasilien (1970, "Geology of Brazil"). Beurlen died in Tübingen on 27 December 1985.
