= Surveying and Mapping Act =

Surveying and Mapping Act, 2014

Parliament of Pakistan
- Long title: An Act to provide for constitution and regulation of Survey of Pakistan
- Citation: Act No. I of 2014, No. F. 9(10)/2014-Legis.
- Territorial extent: Whole of Pakistan
- Passed by: National Assembly of Pakistan
- Passed: March 31st, 2014
- Assented to: May 12th, 2014

Legislative history
- Bill title: Surveying & Mapping Bill-2014
- Bill citation: No. 9 of 1st Parliamentary Year
- Introduced by: Ministry of Defence
- Status: In force

The Surveying and Mapping Act was assented to by the President of Pakistan in May 2014 after being passed by the National Assembly in order to regulate geospatial data.

== History ==
In 2012, the Land Surveying and Mapping Bill was proposed to entrust all mapping responsibilities in Pakistan to the Survey of Pakistan. The proposed bill would require all government and private agencies involved in surveying and mapping to register with the Survey of Pakistan; failure to comply would be punished with one year of imprisonment and a fine of up to one million rupees. The Ministry of Defence argued that the mapping activities of unauthorised firms could go unchecked without a law or regulatory authority. The objectives of the proposed bill would be to prevent the unauthorised mapping of sensitive areas (a potential security risk), prevent damage to survey markers, avoid duplication of mapping efforts, and to make the Survey of Pakistan a National Mapping Agency.

The bill was passed by Pakistan's National Assembly in 2014.

== Reception ==
Syed Ali Asjad Naqvi, Research and Training Director at the Center for Economic Research in Pakistan (CERP), expressed bafflement towards the proposed bill, stating that it will hinder ongoing humanitarian efforts which employ mapping. Naqvi added that bills should be proposed by public representatives rather than the military.

== See also ==
- Geospatial Information Regulation Bill, 2016 (India)
