= Therese zu Oettingen-Spielberg =

German paleontologist

Princess Therese zu Oettingen-Spielberg (1909–1991) was a German paleontologist known for her work as a paleontological curator at the Palaeontological Museum, Munich. She is credited with saving much of the museum's geological collection during the 1944 bombing of Munich.

== Biography ==
Therese zu Oettingen-Spielberg was born in 1909. Oettingen-Spielberg was a noblewoman, of the House of Oettingen. She held a doctorate in zoology.

During the bombing of Munich (1944) in the Second World War, Oettingen-Spielberg was one of the paleontological curators at the Bavarian State Collection for Palaeontology and Geology (the modern-day Palaeontological Museum, Munich). The director of the museum, Karl Beurlen, was a convinced national socialist, and did not believe that the Allies would be able to bomb Munich. From 1943 onwards, some of the curators at the museum began to evacuate parts of the paleontological and geological collections, against the will and efforts of Beurlen. Shortly before the bombings, Oettingen-Spielberg worked covertly with paleontologist Ferdinand Broili and Georg Spiegler, an employee at the Ludwig-Maximilians-Universität München, to save the museum's geological collection. Oettingen-Spielberg ensured access to unused beer cellars on her family estate, Schloss Oettingen in the Nördlinger Ries. Through Oettingen-Spielberg and Spiegler's efforts, most of the geological collection of the museum—except what was actually on display, and thus visible to Beurlen on a daily basis—left Munich, and survived the war unharmed. Most of the paleontological collection of the museum, which was not as easy to transport, was destroyed in the bombing.

In the winter of 1955–1956, Oettingen-Spielberg accompanied Richard Dehm and Helmut Vidal on a paleontological expedition to Ganda Kas in Punjab, Pakistan. Oettingen-Spielberg, Dehm, and Vidal collected many fossils from the Middle Eocene. Oettingen-Spielberg and Dehm went on the study the mammalian fossils collected. They described the fossils together in 1958, and named four new genera and seven new species, including the early whale relatives Gandakasia and Ichthyolestes.

Oettingen-Spielberg continued to work as a curator at the Palaeontological Museum, Munich until the 1970s. She died in 1991.
