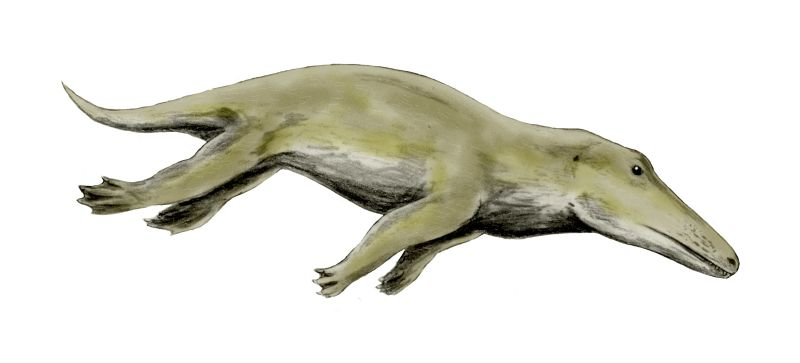
- Ambulocetus natans

Scientific classification
- Kingdom: Animalia
- Phylum: Chordata
- Class: Mammalia
- Order: Artiodactyla
- Infraorder: Cetacea
- Family: †Ambulocetidae; Thewissen, Madar & Hussain 1996

Genera
- Ambulocetus; Gandakasia; Himalayacetus

= Ambulocetidae =

Ambulocetidae Temporal range: Early Eocene, 48–41.2 Ma

Family of mammals

Ambulocetidae is a family of early cetaceans from northern South Asia. The genus Ambulocetus, after which the family is named, is by far the most complete and well-known ambulocetid genus due to the excavation of an 80% complete specimen of Ambulocetus natans. The other two genera in the family, Gandakasia and Himalayacetus, are known only from teeth and mandibular fragments. Retaining large hindlimbs, it was once thought that they could walk on land—indeed, their name means "walking whales"—, but recent research suggests they may have been fully aquatic like modern cetaceans, though the research has some limits that cast doubt on this conclusion.

== Description ==
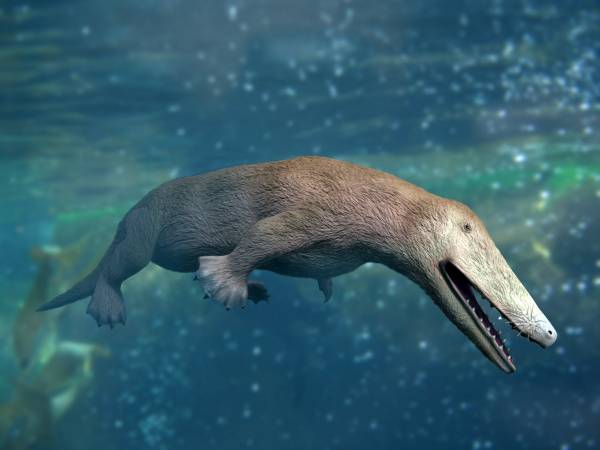
Ambulocetus swimming

The most basal of marine cetaceans, ambulocetids lived in shallow near-shore environments such as estuaries and bays, but were still dependent on fresh water during some stage of their life. Some of the characteristics related to sound transmission found in the lower jaws of modern whales that were absent in pakicetids are present in ambulocetids. They probably swam by paddling their large feet, which is not a very efficient mode of locomotion, suggesting they ambushed rather than chased prey. Ambulocetids had a narrow head with eyes facing laterally. Another lineage of fully aquatic freshwater predators, the neochoristoderes such as Champsosaurus, also have forward-faced eyes, as opposed to the dorsally positioned eyes of crocodilians and other amphibious predators.

Ambulocetus and Gandakasia primarily ate terrestrial prey, while a combination of low-oxygen isotope and high-carbon isotope values suggests that Himalayacetus consumed fresh water but ate marine prey, thus that it foraged in a marine environment but drank fresh water.

== Phylogeny ==
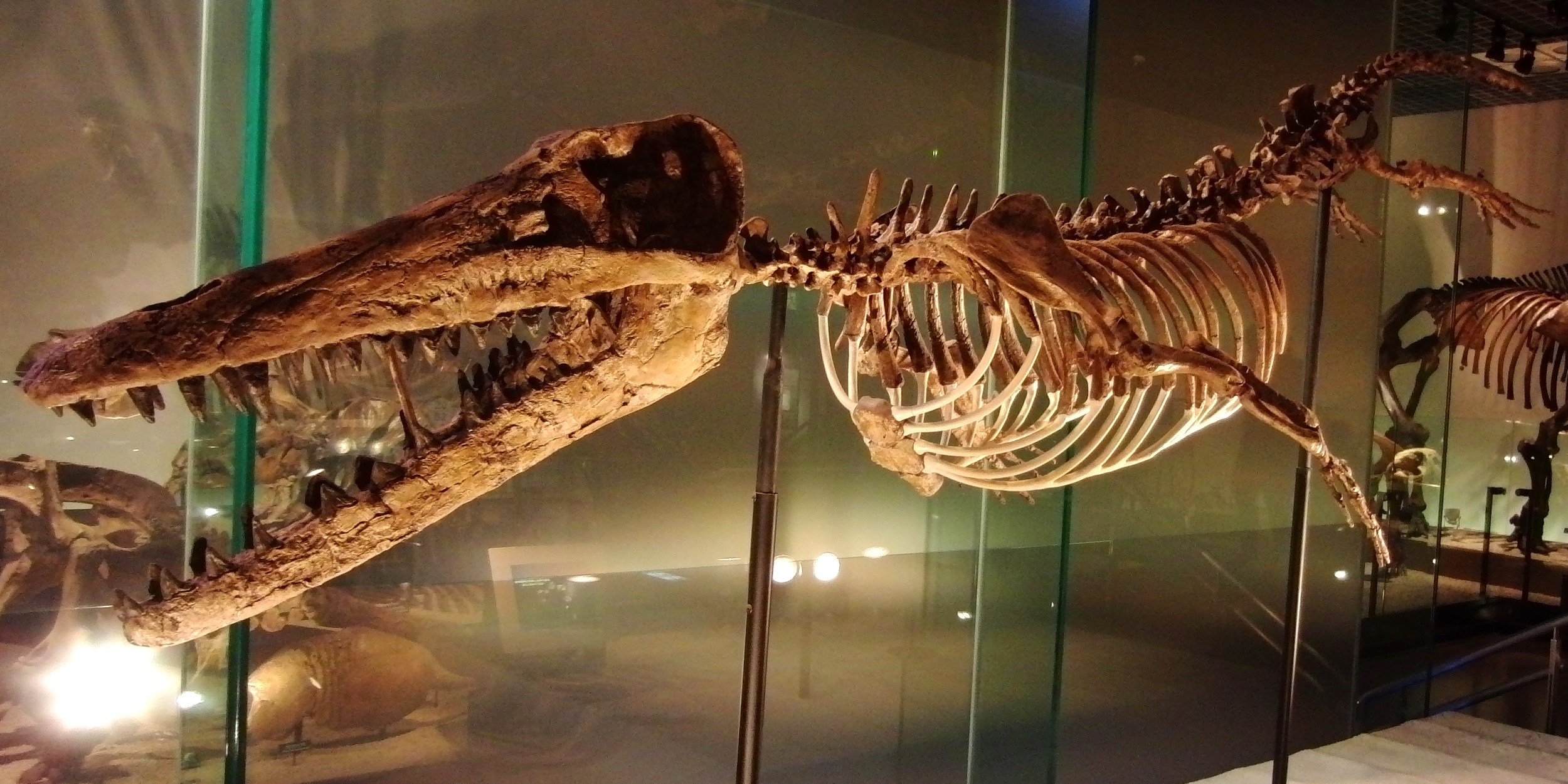
Skeleton of Ambulocetus natans

Ambulocetid fossils have been found in Pakistan along the former coastline of Cimmeria. The sedimentary facies in which these fossils were found indicates that ambulocetids inhabited a shallow, swampy near-shore marine environment. They may have occupied a similar ecological niche to river dolphins.

The family is believed to have diverged from the more terrestrial Pakicetidae. The families Protocetidae and possibly Remingtonocetidae, are believed to have arisen from a common ancestor with ambulocetids. Together with Basilosauridae, the five families are classified under the suborder Archaeoceti.

== See also ==
- Evolution of cetaceans
