= Mian Mohammed Sharif =

Mohammad Sharif
- Born: 24 December 1917; Singhpur, Punjab, British India
- Died: 22 October 1997 (aged 79); Rawalpindi, Punjab, Pakistan
- Citizenship: Pakistan
- Education: Aligarh Muslim University; Government College University
- Known for: Work in Topology, Contour and geological sciences
- Scientific career
- Fields: Mathematics
- Workplaces: Geological Survey of Pakistan; Survey of Pakistan

Mian Mohammed Sharif (Urdu: محمد شريف; b.1917 – 22 October 1997), was a Pakistani mathematician and senior bureaucrat. From 1974 until 1981, he served as the surveyor general at the Survey of Pakistan and briefly served as the senior scientist at the Geological Survey of Pakistan for most of his career.

== Biography ==
Hailed from East Punjab, he was educated at the DAV College and went on to attend the Aligarh Muslim University (AMU) where he gained his bachelor's and master's degree in mathematics. After AMU, he moved to Lahore to attend the Government College University, where he gained a PhD in mathematics from the Government College University and briefly served as postdoctoral researcher at the Aligarh Muslim University. He joined the British Geological Survey (BGS) and opted for Geological Survey of Pakistan in 1947 where served as research scientist there.

At the GSP, his work was mainly involved in extensive studying of Contour lines maps of Pakistan. In the 1970s, he was transferred to the Survey of Pakistan, and worked in close coordination with the military on clandestine atomic bomb project. His work was mainly involved in mathematical studies of the minerals and materials. In 1974–81, he was appointed as surveyor-general and put as the director of the survey of nuclear tests sites program. In 1983, he was transferred to GSP where he continued his research on minerals and materials.
