= Surveyor General of Pakistan =

- Incumbent; Major General Kamal Azfar since 2025
- Survey of Pakistan
- Nominator: Chief of Army Staff (Pakistan)
- Appointer: Prime Minister of Pakistan
- Term length: 3 Years
- Inaugural holder: G.F. Heaney
- Formation: 1947
- Website: surveyofpakistan.gov.pk

Surveyor General of Pakistan (Urdu: ناظمِ عمومیِ مساحتِ پاکستان) is the Head of Survey of Pakistan, a National Mapping Organisation working under the Ministry of Defense of the Government of Pakistan. The Surveyor Generals of Pakistan had been coming from civil as well as military setups. According to parliament approval, at present Surveyor General of Pakistan is a serving Major General coming from Army Corps of Engineers. Major General Kamal Azfar, HI(M) is the current Surveyor General of Pakistan.

== List of Surveyors General ==
Surveyor General	Start of Term	End of Term
Brigadier G.F. Heaney	1946	1947
Brigadier R.C.N. Jenney	1947	1950
Colonel C.A.K. Innes Wilson	1950	1954
M.N.A. Hashmie	1954	1961
A.R. Quraishi	1962	1963
A. Ahad	1963	1966
G.H. Khan	1966	1969
M. Alauddin Piracha	1969	1970
S.Q. Hassan	1970	1974
Mian Mohammed Sharif	1974	1980
Major General Anis Ali Syed	1981	1990
Major General Muhammad Arshad Malik	1991	1992
Major General Nazir Hussain	1992	1995
Major General (Later Lt Gen) Jehangir Nasrullah	1995	1996
Major General Mahboob Ul Muzaffar	1996	2001
Major General Sabih Udin Bukhari	2001	2002
Major General Tariq Javed	2002	2003
Major General Jamil Ur Rahman	2003	2007
Major General Asif Ali	2007	2009
Major General Munawar Ahmad Solehria	2009	2013
Major General Zahir Shah	2013	2014
Major General Imran Zafar	2014	2017
Major General Akhtar Jamil Rao	2017	2019
Major General Shahid Pervaiz	2019	2022
Major General Saeed Akhtar	2022	2023
Major General Rafiq Ur Rehman	2023	2025
Major General Kamal Azfar	2025	Present

== See also ==
- Survey of Pakistan
