= Himalayacetus =

Himalayacetus Temporal range: Early Middle Eocene, 47 Ma

Scientific classification
- Kingdom: Animalia
- Phylum: Chordata
- Class: Mammalia
- Infraclass: Placentalia
- Order: Artiodactyla
- Infraorder: Cetacea
- Family: †Ambulocetidae
- Genus: †Himalayacetus; Bajpai & Gingerich, 1998
- Species: †H. subathuensis

Binomial name
- †Himalayacetus subathuensis Bajpai & Gingerich, 1998

Extinct aquatic mammal

Himalayacetus is an extinct genus of carnivorous aquatic mammal of the family Ambulocetidae. The holotype was found in Himachal Pradesh, India, (31.0°N 77.0°E: paleocoordinates 3.5°N 69.7°E) in what was the remnants of the ancient Tethys Ocean during the Early Eocene. Himalayacetus was found in the Upper Subathu Formation of Kuthar Nala in Lesser Himalayas of Himachal Pradesh, India. Himalayacetus is dated to be around 47 million years old, making it one of the last representatives of ambulocetids.

Himalayacetus lived in the ancient coastline of the ancient Tethys Ocean before the Indian Plate had collided with the Cimmerian coast. Like Gandakasia, Himalayacetus is only known from a single jaw fragment, making comparisons to other ambulocetids difficult.

== Description ==
Upon its discovery, Himalayacetus was described as a pakicetid because the dentary has a small mandibular canal and a dentition similar to Pakicetus. Thewissen, Williams & Hussain 2001 assigned Himalaycetus to the ambulocetids.

== Etymology ==
Himalayacetus was named by Bajpai & Gingerich 1998. Its type is Himalayacetus subathuensis after the Himalayas, cetus, "whale", and the Subathu Formation, the type locality.

== Taxonomy ==
It was considered monophyletic by Uhen (2010). It was assigned to Pakicetidae by Bajpai and Gingerich (1998) and McLeod and Barnes (2008); and to Ambulocetidae by Thewissen et al. (2001) and Uhen (2010).
