= Geospatial Information Regulation Bill =

Parliament of India
- Enacted by: Parliament of India
- Status: Pending

The Geospatial Information Regulation Bill, 2016 was introduced in Parliament of India in 2016.

== Details ==
The Geospatial Information Regulation Bill, 2016 was introduced in Parliament of India in 2016. In the aftermath of the Pathankot Attack of 2016, to regulate the spatial info on maps such as Google Maps, the bill was prepared to restrict mapping by private companies with licensing. The bill was severely criticized for being too restrictive and not practical in its scope attracting severe reactions from industry and other government departments alike. The initial wordings of the draft show the purpose of the regulation:

A Bill to regulate the acquisition, dissemination, publication and distribution of geospatial information of India which is likely to affect the security, sovereignty and integrity of India and for matters connected therewith or incidental thereto.

On 15 February 2021 the Department of Science & Technology released approved Guidelines for acquiring and producing Geospatial Data and Geo-spatial Data services including Maps. These guidelines would largely replace the restrictions proposed within the Geospatial Information Regulation Bill of 2016 by deregulating the sector and allowing collaboration between industry and government agencies.
