= Survey of Pakistan =

National mapping agency of Pakistan

- مساحتِ پاکستان

Agency overview
- Type: Geology, Mineralogy, Geography and Earth Sciences
- Jurisdiction: Federal Government of Pakistan
- Headquarters: Rawalpindi, Pakistan
- Employees: ~1312
- Annual budget: ₨. 172.5 million
- Agency executive: Major General Kamal Azfar, HI(M), Surveyor General of Pakistan
- Parent agency: Ministry of Defence (Pakistan)
- Website: Survey of Pakistan

Survey of Pakistan (Urdu: مساحتِ پاکستان, romanized: masāhat-e-pākistān) is the sole national mapping and land surveying government agency of Pakistan. Its head of department is titled as "Surveyor General of Pakistan".

== About Survey of Pakistan ==
Survey of Pakistan, which emerged as successor to pre-partition Royal Survey of India, is a National Surveying and Mapping Organization of the country. It is primarily responsible for all sorts of topographical land surveys of cis-frontier areas of the entire country. The basic products include map sheets on scale 1:50,000 and 1:250,000. The department is actively participating in the national development projects and thus fulfilling the ever growing surveying and mapping demands of various government / semi-government and autonomous bodies. The geodetic data prepared and maintained by the department is matchless in its accuracy and use. Over the past years, the department has taken a mile stone turn by gradually switching over to surveying and mapping using modern techniques, methods and equipment. This resulted in the outstanding capability of using and manipulating topographical data to develop wide range of applications including Geographic Information System.

=== Mission ===
To delineate and demarcate International Borders, carry out topographic survey, prepare national geographical data base and publish maps of Pakistan Type Geology, Mineralogy, Geography, and Earth Sciences

=== Functions ===
To survey, print and publish topographical maps of cis-frontier terrain of Pakistan on scale 1:50,000 and derived maps on scales 1:250,000 and 1:1,000,000 for general public use and the defence forces of Pakistan. To establish and maintain geodetic network in the entire country. To delineate and demarcate international borders of Pakistan. To carry out cantonment surveys and others surveys on any desired scale which government / semi government/ autonomous bodies may demand. In addition to above maps preparation of other derived products like Provincial, District, Tehsil maps, Guide maps, Street Maps. A ~ Z Maps and Atlases of desired information for national development projects and general public. To establish and maintain National Spatial Data Infrastructure (NSDI) of Pakistan.

=== Regional Offices ===
- Geographic Information Centre, Lahore.
- Geographic Information Centre, Peshawar.
- Geographic Information Centre, Karachi.
- Geographic Information Centre, Quetta.

=== Specialized ===
- Directorate of Technical & Coordination, Rawalpindi.
- Directorate of Printing & Geodesy, Rawalpindi.
- Directorate of Photogrammetry and Remote Sensing, Rawalpindi.
- Directorate of Cartography & GIS, Rawalpindi.

=== Training ===
- Survey Training Institute, Islamabad.
- Directorate of Training & Research, Rawalpindi.

== See also ==
- Surveyor General of Pakistan
- Geological Survey of Pakistan
