= Gandakasia =

Gandakasia Temporal range: 47.8–41.2 Ma Lutetian

Scientific classification
- Kingdom: Animalia
- Phylum: Chordata
- Class: Mammalia
- Infraclass: Placentalia
- Order: Artiodactyla
- Infraorder: Cetacea
- Family: †Ambulocetidae
- Genus: †Gandakasia; Dehm & Oettingen-Spielberg, 1958
- Species: †G. potens

Binomial name
- †Gandakasia potens Dehm & Oettingen-Spielberg, 1958

Extinct genus of ambulocetid from Pakistan

Gandakasia is an extinct genus of ambulocetid from Pakistan, that lived in the Eocene epoch. It probably caught its prey near rivers or streams. Just like Himalayacetus, Gandakasia is only known from a single jaw fragment, making comparisons to other ambulocetids difficult due to the lack of material. Gandakasia probably inhabited a freshwater niche similar to the pakicetids.

== Discovery ==
Gandakasia, named in 1958 by Richard Dehm and Therese zu Oettingen-Spielberg, was the first ambulcetid to be formally described. Because at the time no other cetaceans were known that possessed a similar morphology, Gandakasia was originally mistaken as a mesonychian. However, in 1977, Phillip Gingerich suggested that Gandakasia was a basal member of cetacea.
