= Palaeontological Museum, Munich =

Natural History museum in Munich, Germany

Coordinates: 48°08′51″N 11°33′50″E

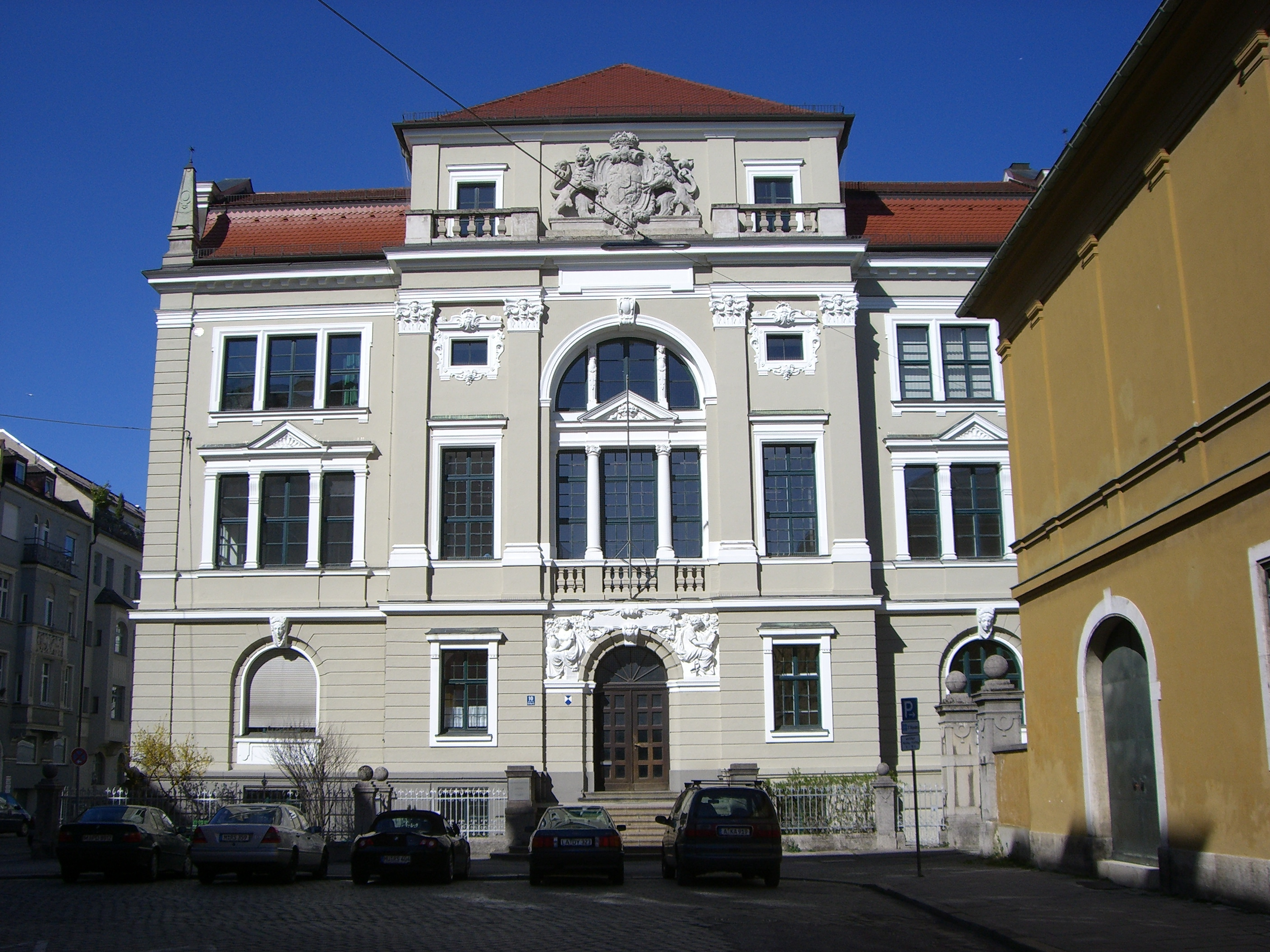
Paläontologisches Museum

Palaeontological Museum, Munich

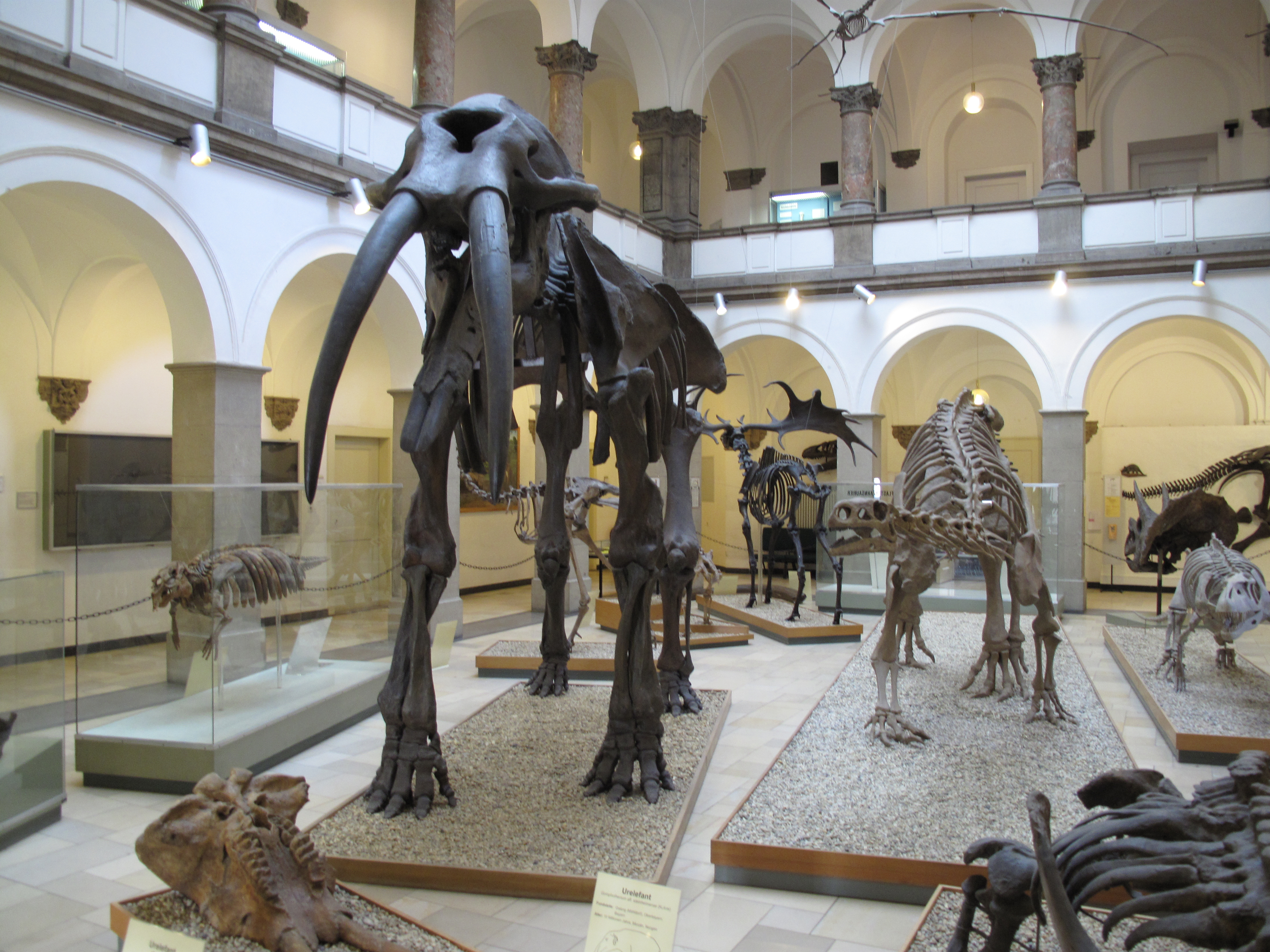
Exhibition of the Paläontologisches Museum.

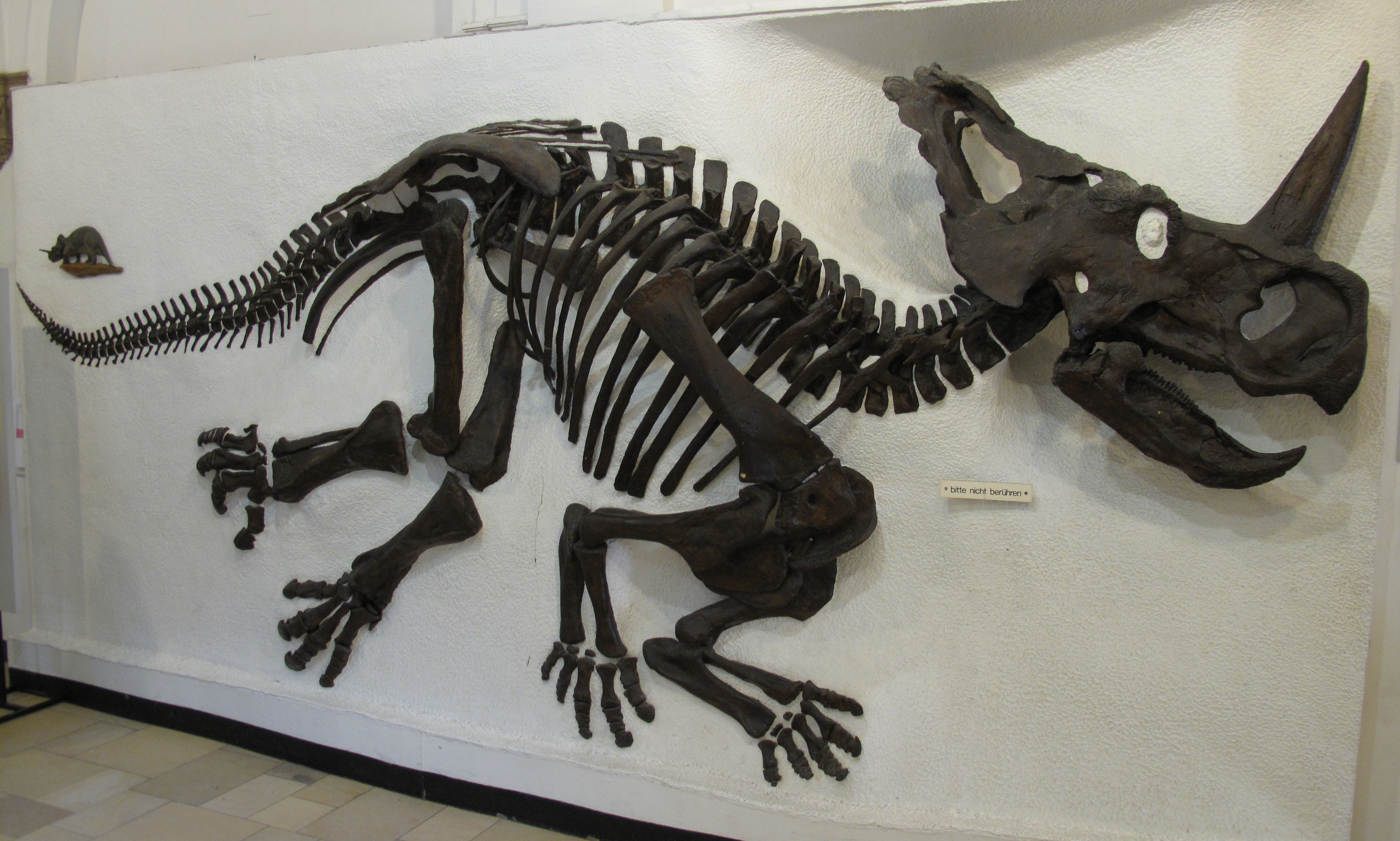
A Centrosaurus apertus in the Paläontologisches Museum.

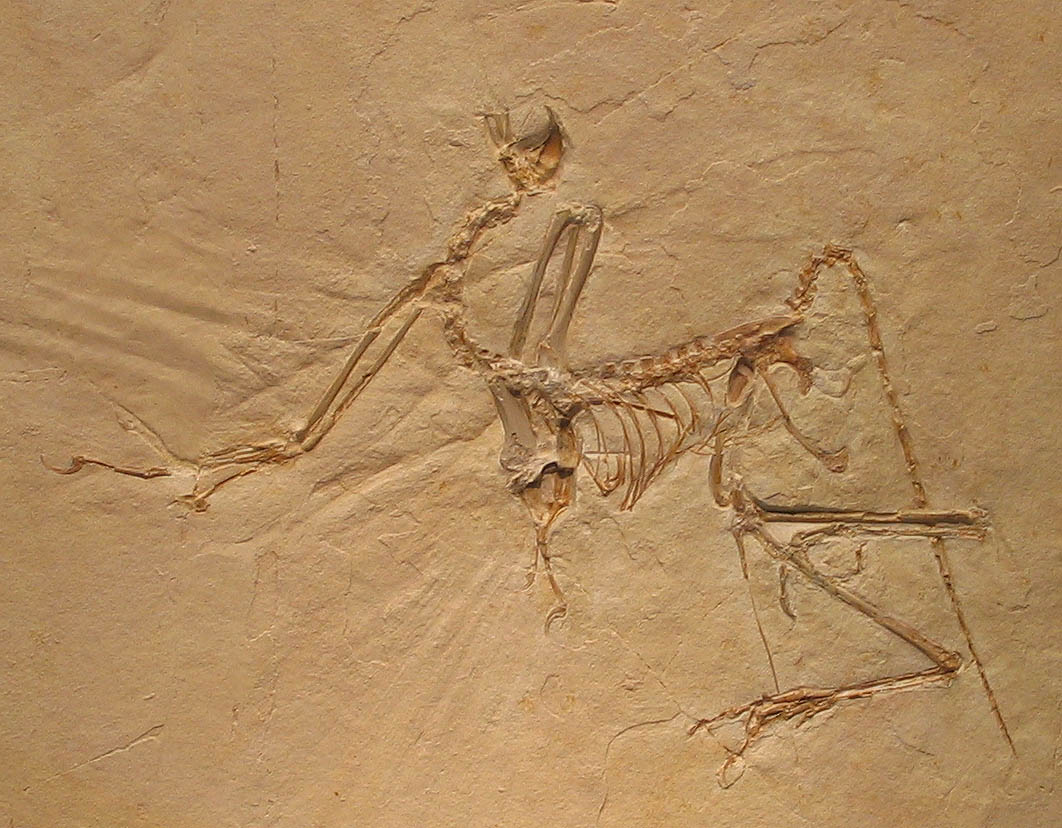
Display cast of Archaeopteryx (specimen S6)

The Palaeontological Museum in Germany (Paläontologisches Museum München), is a German national natural history museum located in the city of Munich, Bavaria. It is associated with the Ludwig-Maximilians-Universität München (LMU). It has a large collection of fossils of animals and plants such as Mesozoic reptiles, early elephants and saber-toothed cats. The paleontological and geological institute which houses the museum is formally called the Bavarian State Collection for Palaeontology and Geology (Bayerische Staatssammlung für Paläontologie und Geologie, BSPG), which itself is one of several institutions which make up the Bavarian Natural History Collections (Staatliche Naturwissenschaftliche Sammlungen Bayerns, SNSB).

One of its highlights is the "Munich Specimen" of the early bird Archaeopteryx discovered in 1992. The museum is also interesting because of the architecture of its building, the former urban college of arts and crafts.

The museum was badly damaged by a World War II British bombing raid of Munich in April 1944. Among the fossil dinosaur specimens destroyed were Spinosaurus, Tameryraptor, Bahariasaurus and Aegyptosaurus.

== See also ==
- List of museums in Germany
- List of natural history museums
