= Bombing of Munich in World War II =

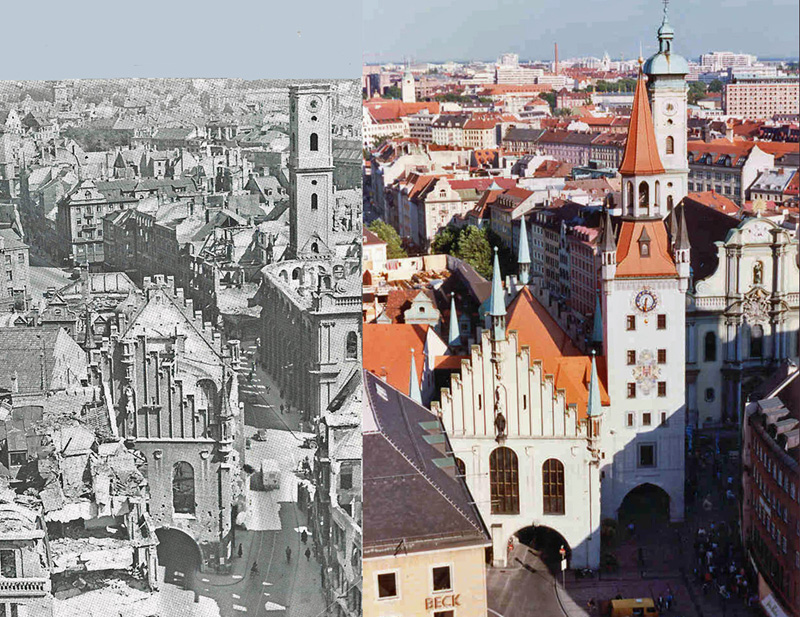
View of Munich in 1945 and 1989

The Bombing of Munich took place mainly in the later stages of World War II. Munich was, and is, a significant German city, as much culturally as industrially. Augsburg, 37 miles (60 km) to the west, was a main center of diesel engine production (and still is today), and was also heavily bombed during the war. Although some considerable distance from the United Kingdom, Munich is not a difficult city to find from the air due to both its size and proximity to the Austrian Alps to the south-east, which was used as a visual reference point. Munich was protected initially by its distance from the United Kingdom. After a small air raid in November 1940 the city got little attention from bombers until 1944.

Munich was bombed by the Royal Air Force (RAF) and the United States Army Air Forces (USAAF). There were 74 air raids on Munich, with 6,632 people killed and 15,800 wounded. Around 90% of the old part of the city (Altstadt) was severely damaged due to the policy of carpet bombing (Flächenbombardement). Munich was considered a special target of allied bombings also for propaganda purposes, in that it was the "movement's capital city", the Nazi Party's birthplace. At the start of the Greater Germanic Reich in 1939, Munich had a population of around 830,000, and was the fourth-largest city in Germany.

== 24–25 April 1944 attack ==
=== USAAF ===
During the day of 24 April 1944 the city and the surrounding area was heavily attacked by the USAAF. Over 700 bombers took part in the attack, and were escorted by P-51B, P-38J, and P-47D aircraft, with around 800 fighter aircraft. The Boeing B-17 Flying Fortress and Consolidated B-24 Liberator bomber aircraft came from the 8th and 9th air forces.

The attack was intended to limit production of the Dornier Do 335 at Dornier Flugzeugwerke, Oberpfaffenhofen and turbine blades for the Junkers Jumo 004 axial-flow turbojet. Oberpfaffenhofen is now the home of the mission control center Deutsches Raumfahrt-Kontrollzentrum of the Deutsches Zentrum für Luft- und Raumfahrt e.V. (German Aerospace Centre).

=== RAF ===
On the night of 24 April 1944, 234 Lancasters and 16 Mosquito aircraft from the RAF made a devastating and concentrated attack. About 80% of the buildings in the area were destroyed. The attack was noted for a new method of target marking at low level from 700 feet (210 m). Karlsruhe, further to the north-west, was also heavily bombed by the RAF that night. Nine Lancaster aircraft were lost in the raid.

== Damage ==
Controlled explosion of a 250kg bomb on August 28 2012 in Schwabing, Munich

The city received around 450 large bombs (Luftminen, around 4,000 lb), 61,000 high-explosive bombs, and around 3,316,000 4 lb magnesium incendiary bombs (Stabbrandbombe, developed by ICI). Around 50% of all of Munich was damaged. 81,500 houses were completely or partially destroyed, de-housing around 300,000 inhabitants, 4,185 wounded, 139 killed in an RAF raid on 24/25 April 1944. The deadliest bombing took place on 16 July 1944, with 1,453 killed and 4,525 wounded. The first (and only at the time) Spinosaurus and Aegyptosaurus fossils discovered (by Ernst Stromer) was destroyed during the bombing of Munich on the 25th of April 1944.

== See also ==
- History of Munich
- Bombing of Augsburg in World War II
- Strategic bombing during World War II
- List of strategic bombing over Germany in World War II

== General references ==
- Fliegeralarm – Luftangriffe auf München von 1940 bis 1945, Hugendubel, Munich, 1987, Richard Bauer
- Ruinen-Jahre. Bilder aus dem zerstörten München 1945–1949, Hugendubel, Munich, 1988, Richard Bauer
- Bomber über München. Der Luftkrieg 1939 bis 1945, dargestellt am Beispiel der 'Hauptstadt der Bewegung' , Hans-Günter Richardi, 1992
- Der Luftkrieg über München 1942–1945. Bomben auf die Hauptstadt der Bewegung, Aviatic, Oberhaching, 1996, ISBN 3925505377
