= Geological Survey of Pakistan =

Government agency

- ارضیاتی سروے پاکستان

Agency overview
- Formed: August 14, 1947; 79 years ago
- Headquarters: Quetta-87300, Balochistan, Pakistan
- Employees: ~1,382
- Annual budget: ₨. 1.28 billion
- Agency executive: Adnan Alam Awan, Director-General
- Website: www.gsp.gov.pk

Geological Survey of Pakistan (GSP) is an independent executive scientific agency to explore the natural resources of Pakistan. Main tasks GSP perform are Geological, Geophysical and Geo-chemical Mapping of Pakistan. Target of these mapping are resources exploration, Geo-Engineering assessment, Geo-hazard prediction/prevention and addressing environmental issues.

Apart from studying geology, it has various major science disciplines, concerning biology, engineering, hydrology, chemistry and physics. Due to its reputation and studies on fact-finding research, it has undertaken various efforts and studies on mineral exploration.

Headquartered in Quetta and other regional offices in all over the country, and as of current, Adnan Alam Awan is the current and designated director-general of the Geological Survey of Pakistan.

== History ==
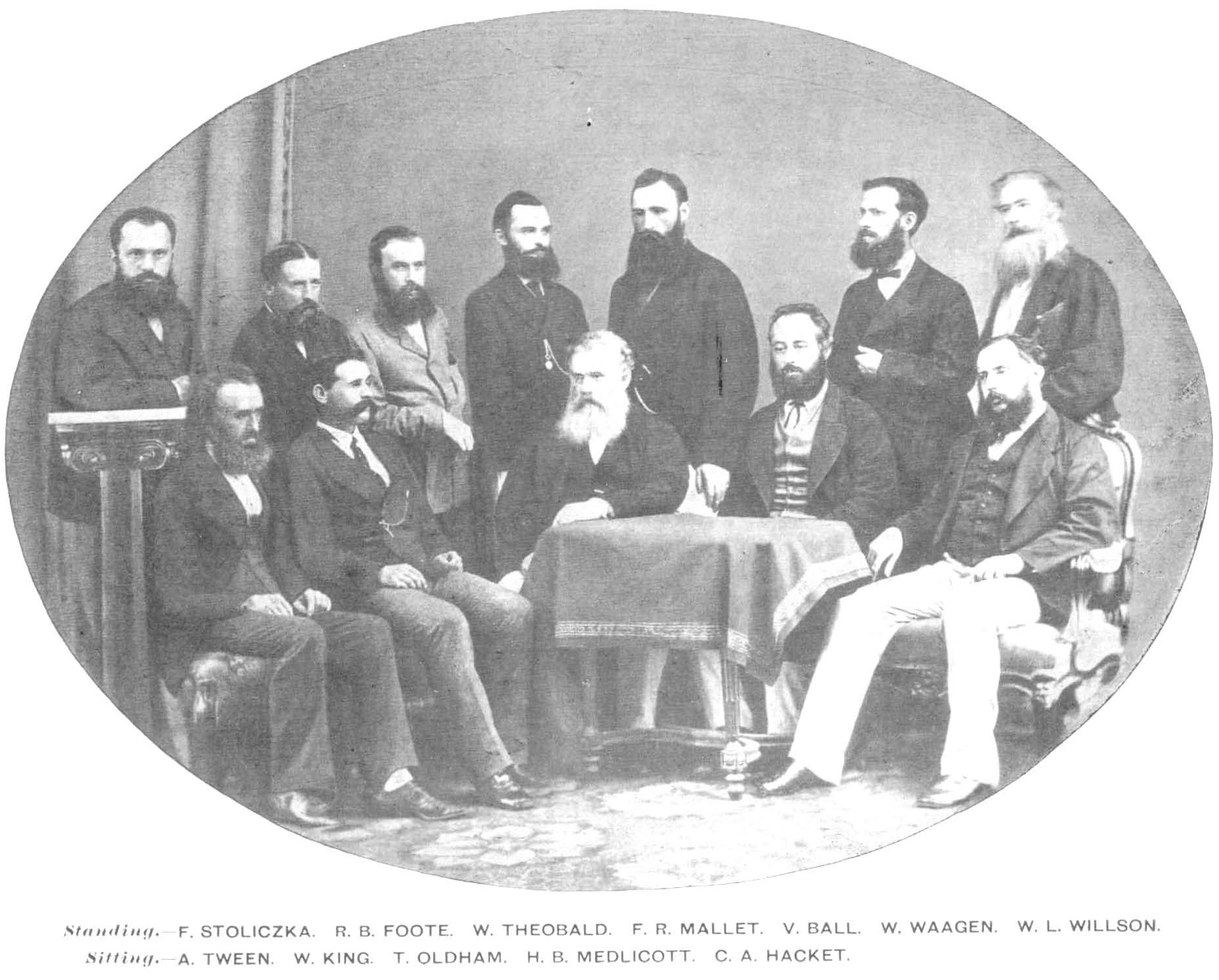
Earliest members of the GSI and BGS in 1851.

As early as 1836–51, the British crown government decided to set up the geological survey to explore the British Indian Empire under the British geologist David Williams who later founded the Geological Survey of India.

After the independence of Pakistan from the British Indian Empire, the Geological Survey of India's north-west branch, staff and assets were evolved into creating to Geological Survey of Pakistan (GSP).

At the time of its establishment, the GSP had consisted of only six geologists and two chemists under British scientist H.L. Crookshank, who was at that time was the most senior scientist working. Immediately, H.L. Crookshank was appointed first director general of GSP which he remained until 1955. Under Crookshank, the technical staff was increased to 30 geoscientists in 1948. In its formative years, the GSP did the pioneering work in hydrogeology and engineering but the efforts were transfer to engineering units of the military. In 1949–55, the GSP initiated a rigorous tradition of field investigations with the governmental support, and reconnaissance technology was transferred to GSP through the Colombo Plan. Due to these activities, it increased the operational, scientific capabilities, and expansion of facilities of the GSP by 1956; it became one of the pioneering scientific institution of the government. In 1955, English geologist, E.R. Gee, took over the GSP who initiated a massive expansion programme for GSP, including engineering, photogeology sections, as well as systematic publications journals were established. In 1959, the construction of new headquarters in Quetta was completed with Dr. N.M. Khan becoming first native GSP's director.

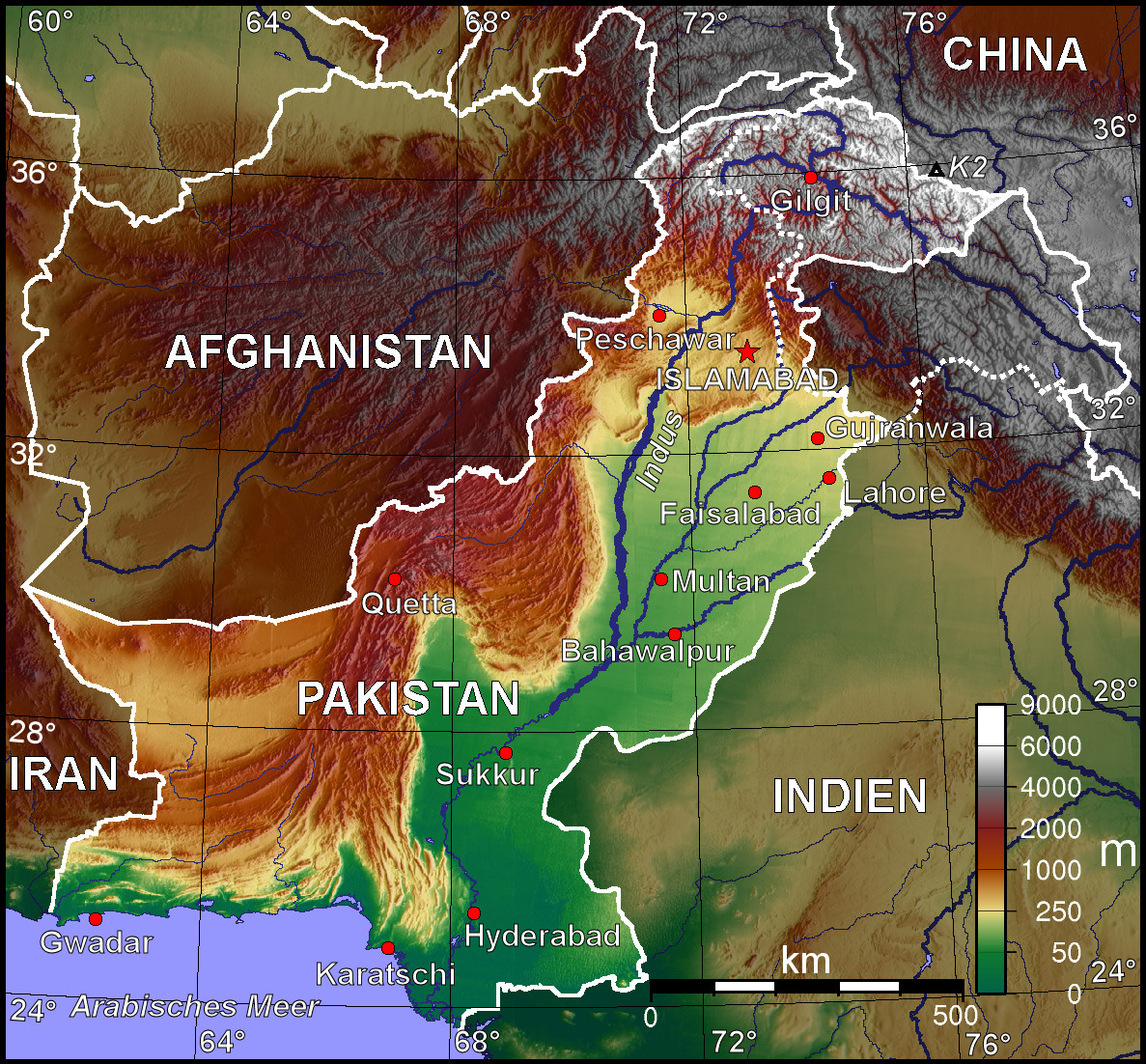
A Topographic map of Pakistan.

By 1956, the GSP worked extremely close with the United States Geological Survey (USGS); the USGS established multimillion-dollar work laboratories and facilities in all over the country and cooperation continued until 1970. In 1957, the GSP discovered the large stockpiles of uranium in Sindh and Punjab. In addition, the GSP helped established country's universities to teach geoscience and engineering as part of their university programmes.

In the 1970s, due to its expansion and scientific capabilities, the GSP was instrumental in carrying out work on nuclear geography, when its scientists frequently visited in various mountain ranges of the country. The GSP notably carried out an ingenious work on nuclear geology and geography as part of the clandestine atomic bomb project, and played an integral role in the selection of the test sites. Throughout this time, the GSP's scientists continued exploring uranium and plutonium, as well as other material sources in all over the country.

In 1992, The GSP announced the discovery of the huge deposits of coal at Thar Desert in Sindh. The GSP sponsored and published various studies on the geology of Thar Desert. In the 1990s, the GSP issued and produced several maps of atlas of Pakistan, with mapping at 1:1 000 000 scale and a variety of themes published at 1:5 000 000. Economic liberalization policies of government in 1992 led the ADB to sponsor a 10-year-long multibillion-dollar mineral exploration programme to cover 14 identified mineralized zones in the country. In the 1990s, the GSP also discovered the large deposits of Gold and Copper in Western Balochistan, southwest Pakistan. In the 2000s, the GSP gained international and public prominence when its scientists discovered and unearthed the first ever dinosaur fossils in Pakistan. The remains were thought to be around ~70 million years old and were found by geologists mapping the Barkhan district of the country's arid Balochistan province. The specimens include legs and vertebrae.

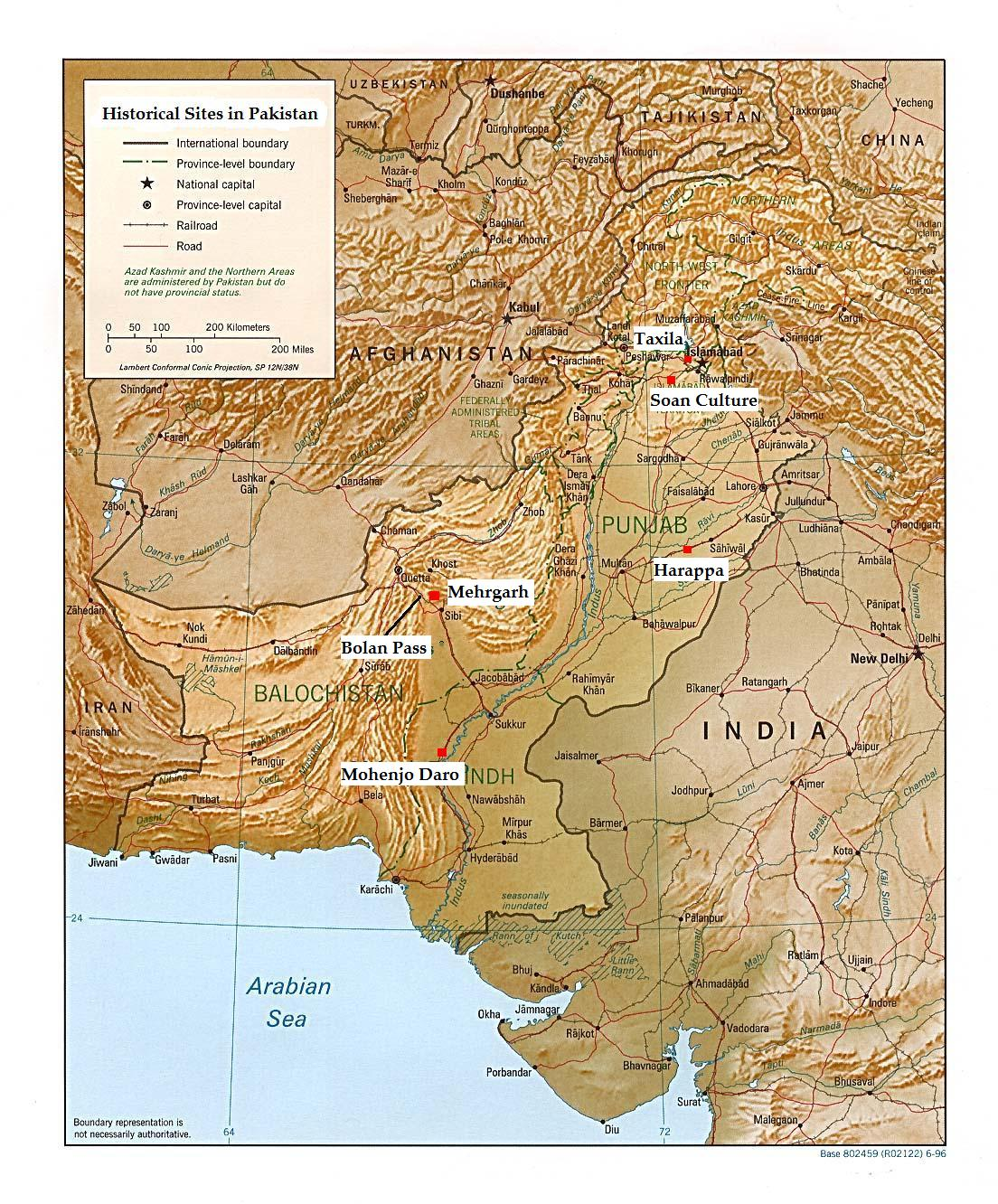
Annotated and historical map of Pakistan.

=== GSP Headquarters ===
Geological Survey of Pakistan Headquarter is located in western city of Pakistan, Quetta. Different branch located in GSP headquarter are given below:

1. Directorate of Planning and Information
2. Directorate of Headquarter
3. Directorate of Publication
4. Directorate of Paleontology and Stratigraphy
5. Directorate of Petrology and Mineralogy
6. Directorate of Drilling
7. Geophysical Division
8. Geochemistry Division
9. Deputy Directorate General Western Zone
10. Transport Branch
11. Hydrogeology Branch

=== List of GSP's Directors General ===
- 1947–55 H.L. Crookshank
- 1955–59 E.R. Gee
- 1959-1967 Nur M. Khan
- 1967–72 Abdul Mannan Khan
- 1972–77 M. Mohammad Sharif
- 1977-79 A.N. Khan
- 1979–84 M. Mohammad Sharif
- 1984–93 Asrarullah Ahmed
- 1993–2000 Abdul Latif Ghulam
- 2000-03: Abdul Latif
- 2003–05: Ahmad Hussain
- 2005-10: Mirza Talib Hassan
- 2010- 2017: Imran Khan
- 2017: Nazar-ul-Islam
- 2018: Mrs Yasmeen Rizvi
- 2018: Dr. Tanveer Ahmad Qureshi

=== GSP publications ===
The GSP researchers, engineers, technicians, and scientists publish the results of their science in a variety of ways. Many researchers publish their science in peer-reviewed scientific journals as well as in one of a variety of series that includes series for preliminary results, maps data, and final results. All publications are published by the GSP and are available as public domains.

Regional Offices of GSP

1. Deputy Directorate General South Zone, Karachi:
2. Deputy Directorate General North Zone, Lahore:
3. Directorate Geosciences Advanced Research Laboratory
4. Regional Office Director Geological Survey Of Pakistan, Peshawar
5. Northern Area Regional Office Directorate GSP, Islamabad.
6. Directorate Regional Office, GSP, Muzaffarabad

=== Accelerated increase in environment ===
In 2006, the Geological Survey's two scientists published an assessed report, predicting the hydrological threat posed to the country. The survey was conducted immediately after the devastated earthquake in 2005, and the GSP's scientists began to study the hazards in the region, which were still geologically unstable.

In 2009, the GSP submitted another report that recommended the potentially hazardous areas of Northern Pakistan where the earthquake and seismic activities were suspected. The survey also found out that the earthquake cracks were found in all over the Atta Abad lake region. The GSP declared the eastern part of the Atta Abad as "High Hazard" area, and recommendations were submitted to evacuate the area.

== See also ==
- Saindak Copper Gold Mine
- Thar Coalfield
