= December 3 (Eastern Orthodox liturgics) =

Day in the Eastern Orthodox liturgical calendar

Eastern Orthodox liturgical calendar
December 2	December 3	December 4
December 3 O.S. ≍ December 16 N.S. December 3 N.S ≍ November 20 O.S.

An Eastern Orthodox cross

December 3 in Eastern Orthodox liturgical calendars is a feast day and a day of commemoration of saints and martyrs. Although some Orthodox churches use the Revised Julian Calendar and others use the traditional Julian calendar, the fixed commemorations for their respective December 3 are broadly the same, no matter which calendar is used. (Note: Despite the dates being the same, the days to which they refer typically differ by 13 days. The notation Old Style or O.S. is sometimes used to indicate a date in the traditional Julian Calendar (the "Old Calendar"). The notation New Style or N.S. indicates a date in the Revised Julian calendar (the "New Calendar").)

== Saints ==
- Prophet Zephaniah (Sophonias) (635–605 BC) (Note: "In Judea, the holy prophet Sophonias.")
- Martyrs Agapius, Seleucus, and Mamas, Indus, Domna, Glycerius, and 40 Martyrs, in Sofianá (see also: December 28)
- Venerable Theodoulos (Theodoulus) the Stylite, Eparch of Constantinople (c. 440) (Note: Theodulus was an eminent Patrician at the court of Theodosius the Great. After the death of his wife, he renounced the vanity of the world and withdrew from Constantinople to a pillar near Ephesus, where he lived a life of asceticism for thirty years.)
- Venerable Theodoulos of Cyprus, Monk
- Saint John the Silent (John Hesychastes), Bishop of Colonia (Taxara) in Armenia, and later a monk of Saint Sabbas (Sava's) Monastery (558) (see also: March 30)
- Hieromartyr Theodore I, Patriarch of Alexandria (609–610) (Note: Hieromartyr Theodore, Archbishop of Alexandria (609), suffered for Christ in Alexandria by idolaters who placed a crown of thorns on the head of St. Theodore and, after abusing him, beheaded him.)

== Pre-Schism Western saints ==
- Saint Lucius, King of Britain who requested missionaries for his people in 187, founding the dioceses of London and Llandaff (2nd century) (Note: "At Coire, in Switzerland, St. Lucius, king of the Britons, who was the first of those kings who received the faith of Christ, in the time of Pope Eleutherius.") (Note: "ST. LUCIUS, whose festival is observed to-day according to the Roman Martyrology and the tradition of Switzerland and Bavaria, was Lucius, the first British prince who received the Faith of Christ. It is said that after his conversion and the acceptance of the Gospel by the greater number of his subjects, he resigned his dominions and went to preach in Germany, finally taking up his abode at Chur, in the canton of the Grisons, whence he was called to the reward of his labours in heaven, and, as some add, to the Martyr's crown. According to the same account, he was accompanied from Britain by his sister EMERITA, who eventually suffered martyrdom at Treves or at Chur."..."King Lucius is said to be Llewr Maur, and his principality to have been in or near Llandaff.")
- Martyr Cassian of Tangier (298) (Note: "At Tangier, in Morocco, St. Cassian, martyr. After having been a recorder for a long time, at length, through the inspiration of heaven, he deemed it an execrable thing to contribute to the massacre of the Christians, and therefore abandoned his office, and making profession of Christianity, deserved to obtain the triumph of martyrdom.")
- Saint Mirocles, Archbishop of Milan and Confessor, helped develop the Ambrosian Liturgy and chanting (318)
- Martyr Agricola, in Pannonia
- Martyrs Claudius, Crispin, Magina, John, and Stephen, in Africa
- Saint Nicetius, Archbishop of Lugdunum (Lyon), Gaul (573)
- Saint Birinus, Bishop of Dorchester, "Apostle to the West Saxons" (649) (Note: "In England, St. Birinus, first bishop of Dorchester.")
- Saint Eloquius (Eloque), disciple and successor of Saint Fursey as Abbot of Lagny (660)
- Saint Ethernan, born in Scotland, became a bishop in Ireland, returned to preach the Gospel in Scotland (7th century)
- Saint Attalia (Attala), a niece of Saint Ottilia, she became a nun and Abbess of St. Stephen's in Strasbourg (741)
- Saint Sola (Sol, Solus, Suolo), Anglo-Saxon missionary priest under Saint Boniface, Germany (794) (Note: A monk and priest from England who followed St. Boniface to Germany and lived as a hermit first near Fulda later near Eichstätt. Finally he settled on a piece of land where he founded the monastery called Solnhofen as a dependency of Fulda monastery.)
- Saint Abbo, Bishop of Auxerre (860)

== Post-Schism Orthodox saints ==
- Venerable Sabbas of Storozhev, Abbot of Storozhev in Zvenigorod, Disciple of Venerable Sergius of Radonezh (1406) (see also: January 19)
- Saint Hilarion Grigorovich, Bishop of Krutitsa (1759) (Note: See also: (in Russian) Иларион (Григорович). Википедии. (Russian Wikipedia).)
- Venerable George (Gregory) of Cernica and Caldarushani, Archimandrite, Romania (1806) (Note: St. George was glorified by the Romanian Orthodox Church in 2005. His holy relics are in the Cernica Monastery, where they are venerated by the faithful.)

=== New martyrs and confessors ===
- New Hieromartyr Gabriel II, Ecumenical Patriarch of Constantinople, previously Bishop of Ganos, at Prusa (1659)
- New Monk-Martyr Cosmas of Saint Anne's Skete, Mount Athos (1760) (Note: Saint Cosmas was a monk of Saint Anne's Skete on Mount Athos. He was executed in Constantinople on December 3, 1760 when he refused to convert to Islam. The specific details of his martyrdom are not known.)
- New Martyr Angelos (Angelus) of Chios, formerly a doctor of Argos (1813)
- New Hieromartyr Andrew Kosovky, Protopresbyter of Simferopol-Crimea (1920)
- New Hieromartyr Nicholas Yershov, Priest of Yaroslavl-Rostov (1937)
- New Confessor George (Gregory) Sedov (1960)

== Other commemorations ==
- Repose of King Magnus II (IV) Eriksson of Sweden and Valaam, Gregory in schema (1371) (Note: According to the Russian Sofia First Chronicle, composed in Novgorod, Magnus in fact, did not drown at sea, but saw the errors of his ways and converted to Orthodoxy, becoming a monk in the Novgorodian monastery in Karelia.)
- Repose of Archimandrite Theophanes of Novoezersk Monastery in Novgorod (1832)

== Icon gallery ==
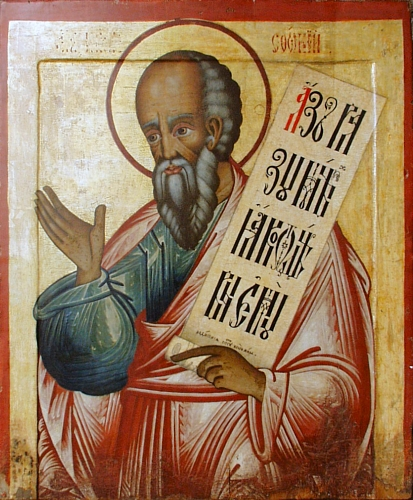
Prophet Zephaniah. (Russian Orthodox icon, 18th century).

Prophet Zephaniah.
(Menologion of Basil II, 10th century).

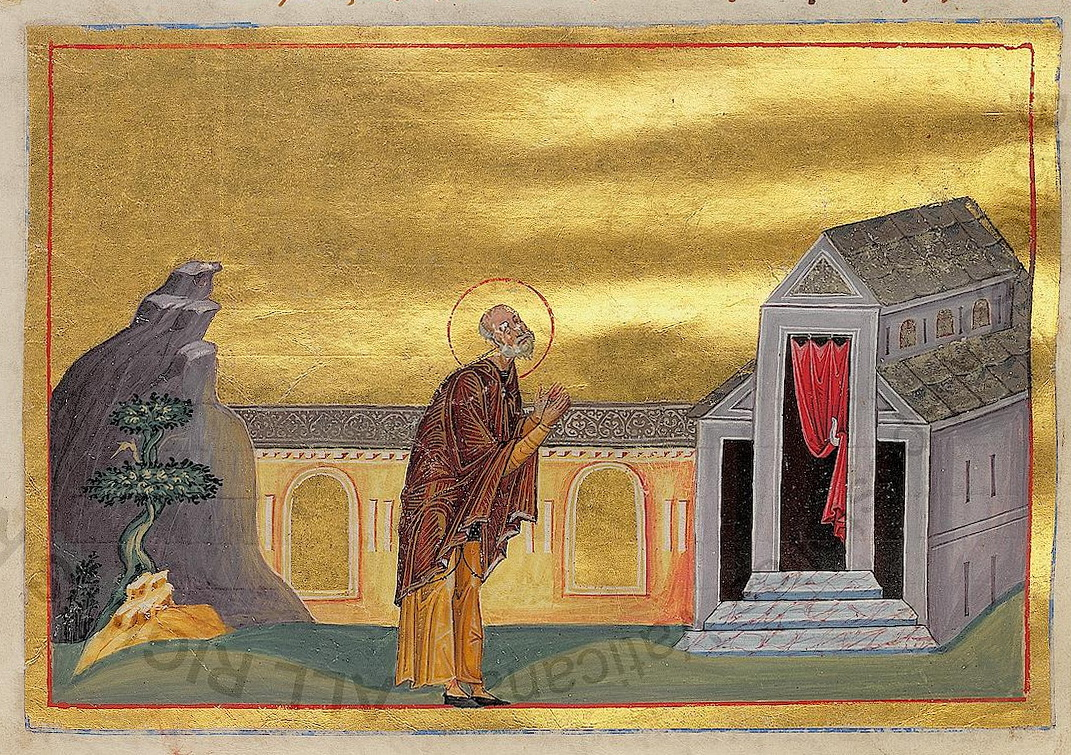
St. Theodoulos the Stylite, Eparch of Constantinople.
(Menologion of Basil II, 10th century).

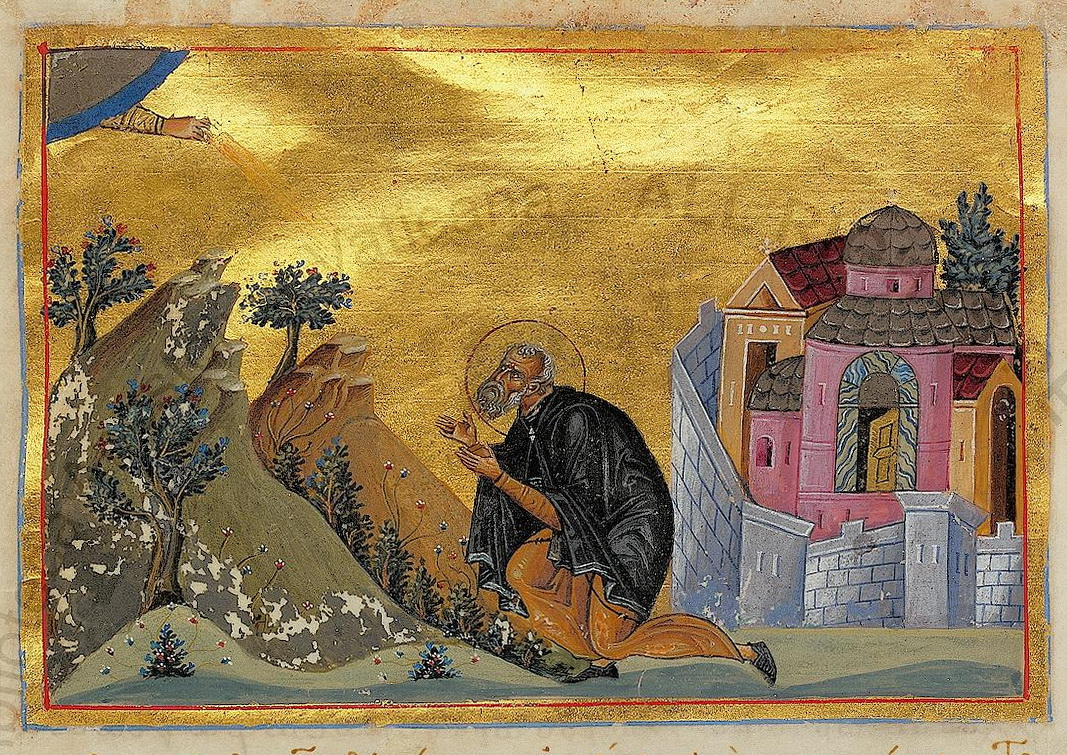
St. John the Silent (John Hesychastes).
(Menologion of Basil II, 10th century).

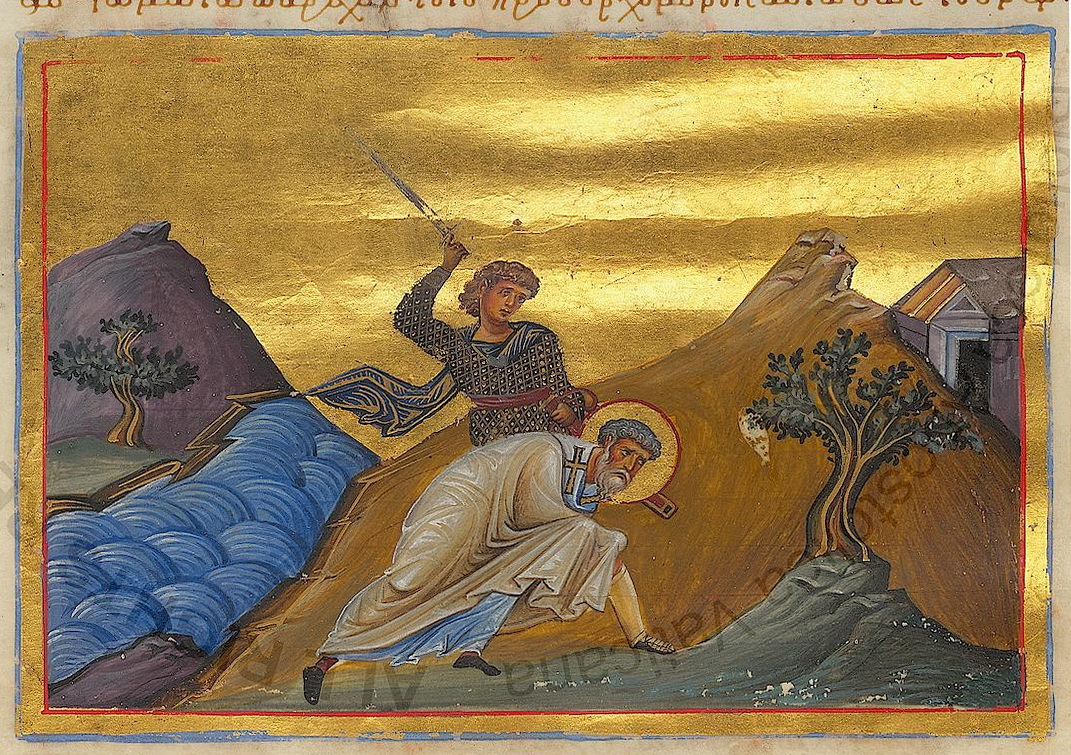
Hieromartyr Theodore I, Patriarch of Alexandria.
(Menologion of Basil II, 10th century).

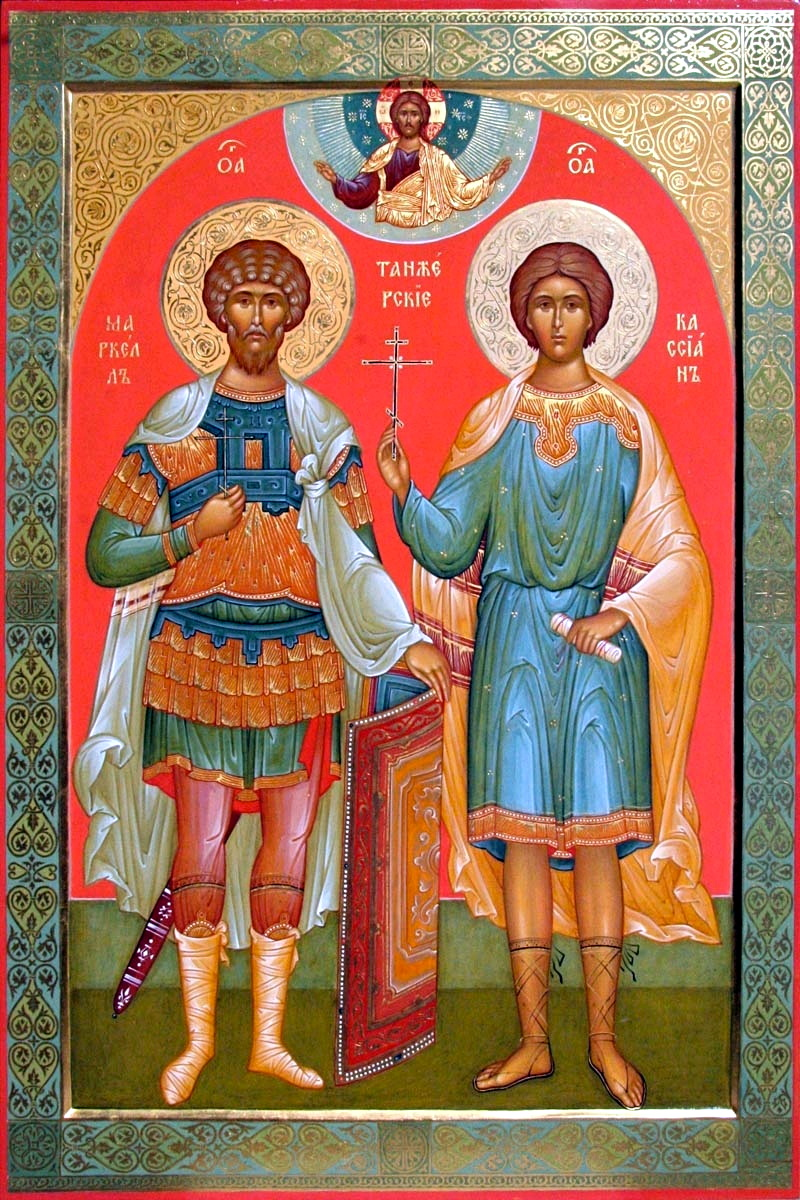
Orthodox icon of Saint Marcellus and Cassian of Tangier.

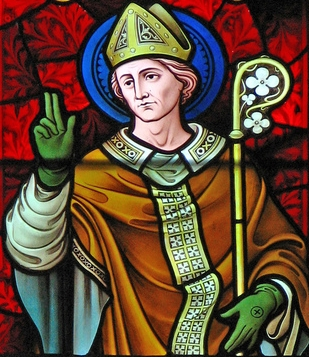
Stained glass Window of St. Birinus.

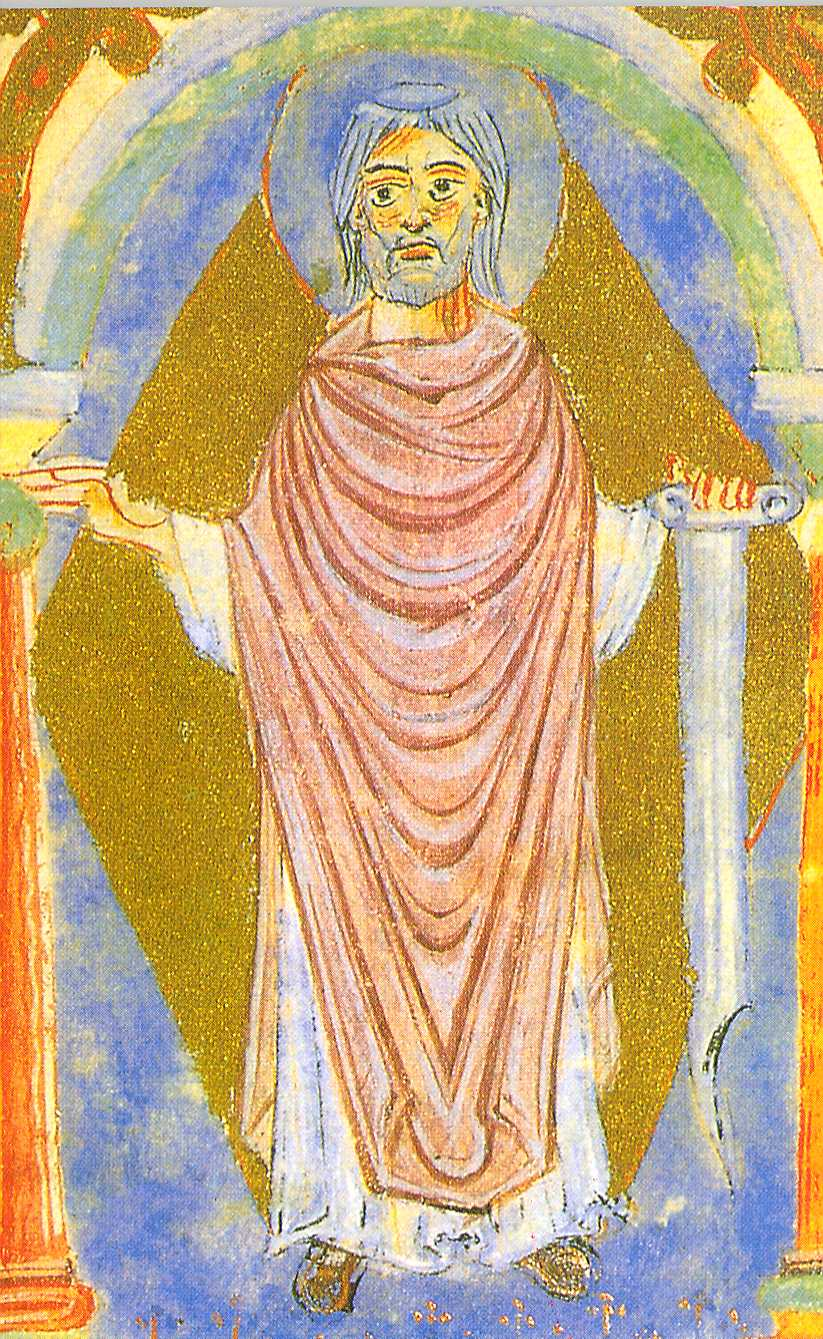
St. Sola, Anglo-Saxon missionary priest under Saint Boniface.

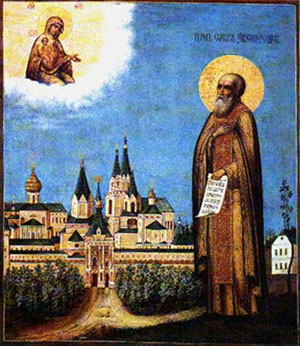
Icon of St. Savva Storozhevsky against the backdrop of a monastery, (19th century).

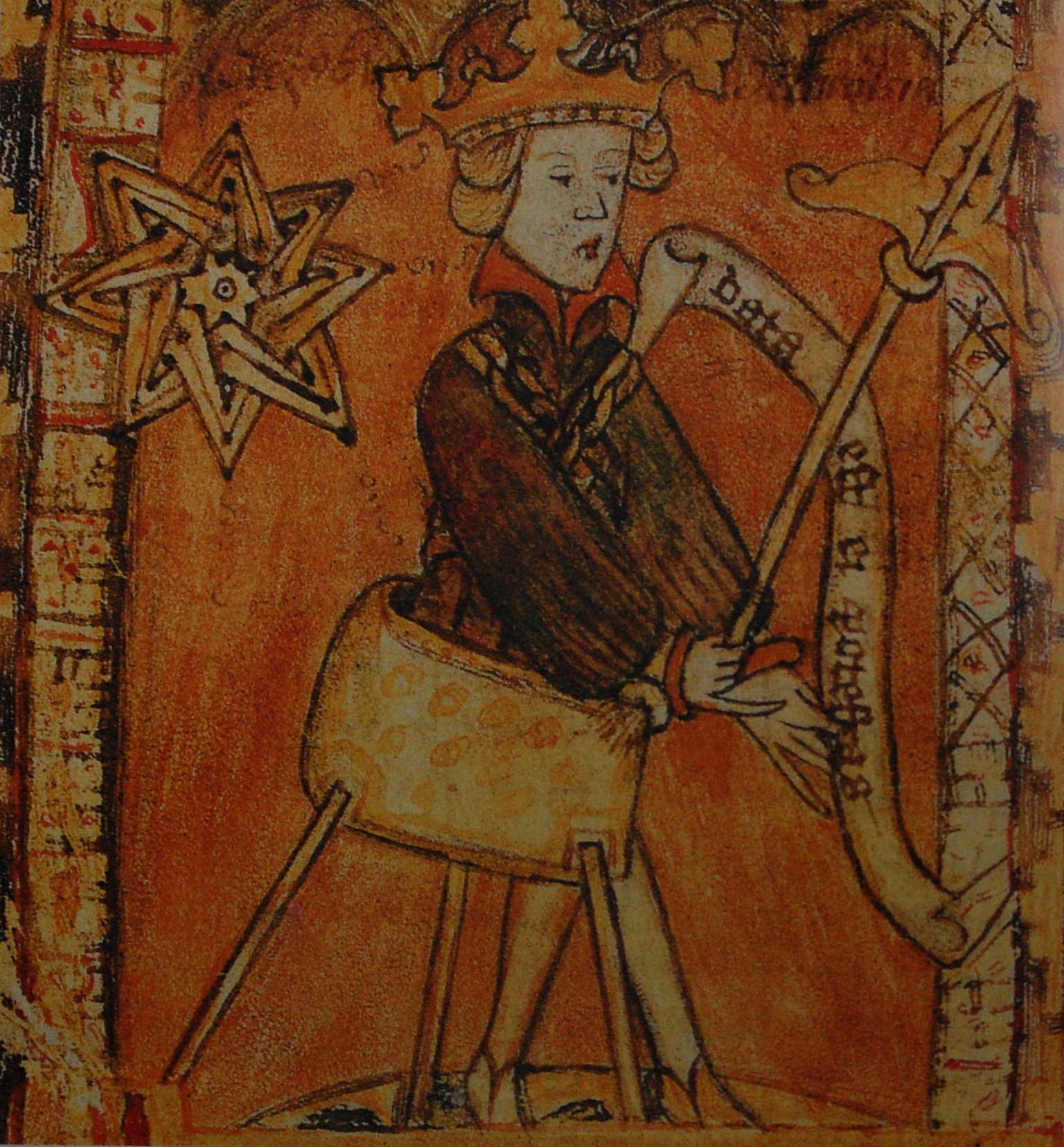
King Magnus II (IV) Eriksson of Sweden, VII of Norway, on the title page of his Swedish national law (Magnus Eriksson's landslag, c. 1350).

== Sources ==
- December 3/16. Orthodox Calendar (PRAVOSLAVIE.RU).
- December 16 / December 3. HOLY TRINITY RUSSIAN ORTHODOX CHURCH (A parish of the Patriarchate of Moscow).
- December 3. OCA – The Lives of the Saints.
- December 3. Latin Saints of the Orthodox Patriarchate of Rome.
- The Roman Martyrology. Transl. by the Archbishop of Baltimore. Last Edition, According to the Copy Printed at Rome in 1914. Revised Edition, with the Imprimatur of His Eminence Cardinal Gibbons. Baltimore: John Murphy Company, 1916. pp. 372–373.
- Rev. Richard Stanton. A Menology of England and Wales, or, Brief Memorials of the Ancient British and English Saints Arranged According to the Calendar, Together with the Martyrs of the 16th and 17th Centuries. London: Burns & Oates, 1892. pp. 579–583.

Greek Sources

- Great Synaxaristes: (in Greek) 3 ΔΕΚΕΜΒΡΙΟΥ. ΜΕΓΑΣ ΣΥΝΑΞΑΡΙΣΤΗΣ.
- (in Greek) Συναξαριστής. 3 Δεκεμβρίου. ECCLESIA.GR. (H ΕΚΚΛΗΣΙΑ ΤΗΣ ΕΛΛΑΔΟΣ).
- (in Greek) December 3. Ορθόδοξος Συναξαριστής.

Russian Sources

- (in Russian) 16 декабря (3 декабря). Православная Энциклопедия под редакцией Патриарха Московского и всея Руси Кирилла (электронная версия). (Orthodox Encyclopedia – Pravenc.ru).
- (in Russian) 3 декабря (ст.ст.) 16 декабря 2014 (нов. ст.). Русская Православная Церковь Отдел внешних церковных связей. (DECR).
