= Gozbald =

German abbot (died 855)

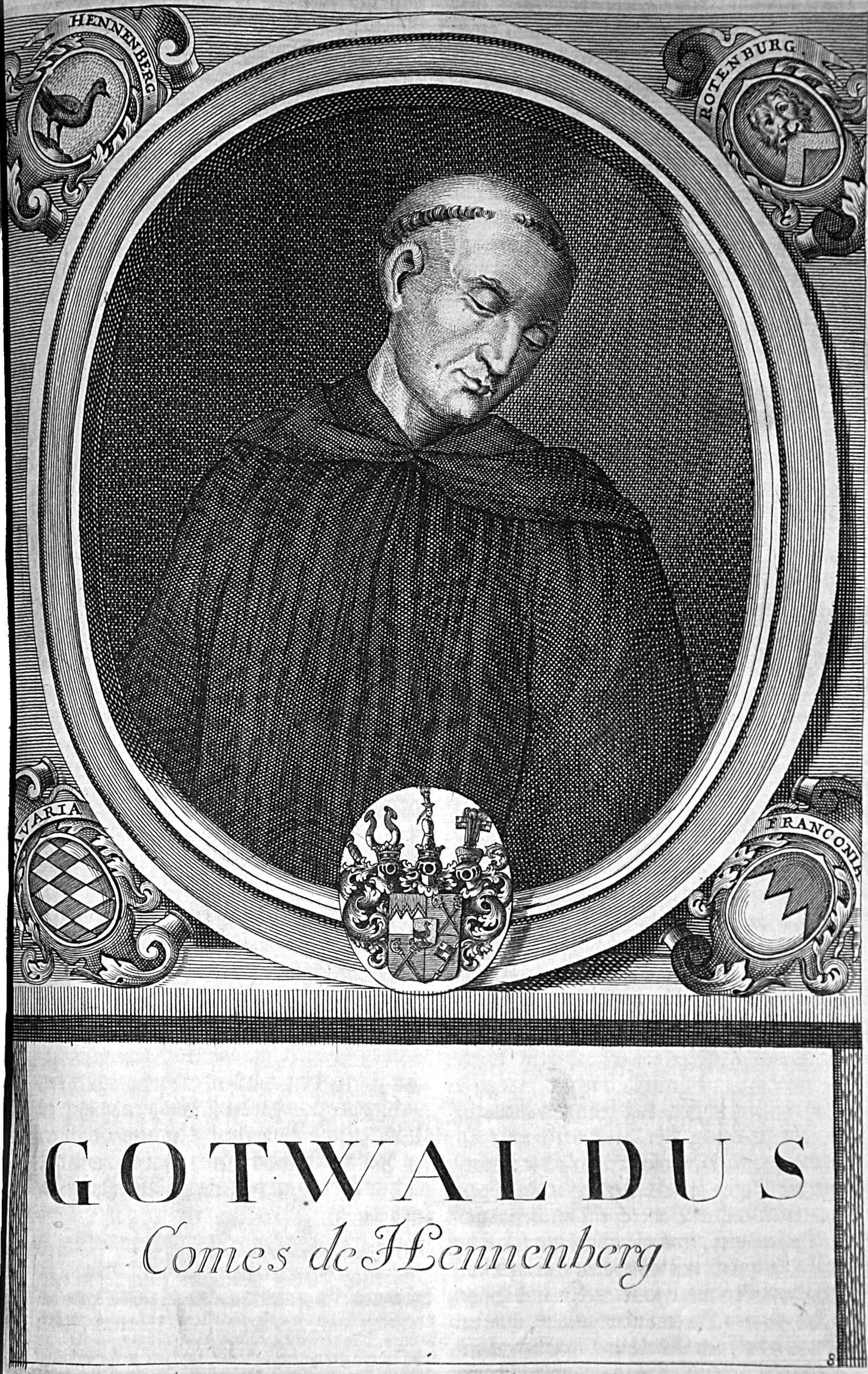
An illustration of Gozbald made by Johann Salver around 1713

Gozbald, in Latin Gozbaldus or Gauzbaldus (died 20 September 855), was the abbot of Niederaltaich from 825, and the bishop of Würzburg from 842, until his death. He also served as chorbishop of the diocese of Passau. On the basis of an entry in the confraternity book of Reichenau Abbey, the historian Gerd Althoff suggests that Gozbald belonged to the Hattonian family.

== Biography ==
Gozbald was probably of East Franconian noble origin. According to historian Joseph Klämpfl, Count Maguntus zu Rottenburg was his father. Historian Janneke Raaijmakers says Gozbald was "presumably educated at Fulda". He joined the clerical profession at the Neustadt am Main Abbey. In 825 Gozbald became abbot of the sixteen monks at Niederaltaich Abbey, and retained that office until his death. Gozbald stayed in touch with his teachers at Fulda for the benefit of contact between the monastic schools. During his tenure as abbot, Gozbald arranged the copying of Augustine’s De civitate Dei and the acquisition of a good number of books for the library of the cathedral of Würzburg, among which are Bibles, commentaries, patristic works and classics.

From 830, Gozbald was the archchaplain and chancellor to Louis the German when the latter was king of Bavaria. In 833 Louis divided the office of archchaplain–chancellor, appointing bishop Baturich of Regensburg and abbot Grimald of Wissembourg, respectively. At Nijmegen on 14 June 838, an imperial assembly under Emperor Louis the Pious decided a dispute between Gozbald and Hraban Maur, abbot of Fulda, in favour of the latter. The dispute concerned some property near Frankfurt. As Gozbald was a familiaris and fildelis ("faithful follower") of Louis the German, this case may be the proximate cause of the ensuing rift between him and the emperor. One of Gozbald's students at the court of Louis the German, Ermanrich, was later a bishop of Passau. When he composed a Vita Hariolfi, a biography of Hariolf, the founder of Ellwangen Abbey, he dedicated it to his teacher Gozbald, a relative of Hariolf.

Gozbald owned a church at Kleinochsenfurt in 838, and in June 841 Louis rewarded him "for his most devoted service" with a gift of land at Ingolstadt. This was at the height of the civil war which followed Louis the Pious's death. After the death of Humbert, bishop of Würzburg, on 9 March 842, Louis appointed Gozbald to succeed him. Until 847, Gozbald was the only bishop in East Francia whose loyalty to Louis was total. All the rest remained loyal to the emperor Lothair I and the archbishop of Mainz, Odgar.

Gozbald was one of the frontier bishops who received the right to conduct land transactions with the local noblemen during the king's stay at Regensburg in 851–52. This right was used to consolidate holdings along the border with the Slavs. Gozbald also acquired some relics of saints Cyprian and Sebastian for his church at Kleinochsenfurt, and Louis sent him to Rome to acquire the relics of Agapitus and Felicissimus for the church at Isarhofen. Gozbald wrote an account of this trip, the Translation of the Holy Martyrs Agapitus and Felicissimus.

Gozbald acquired 35 books for the cathedral library during his reign. He completed the collection of Old Testament books and commentaries and expanded that of the New. He also added works by Cicero, Isidore and Cassiodorus. The production of the scriptorium reached a peak during the time of Gozbald. Shortly before his death Würzburg Cathedral was burned by lightning. After his reign, the diocese underwent a period of rebuilding.

== Sources ==
- Goldberg, Eric Joseph (2006). Struggle for Empire: Kingship and Conflict Under Louis the German, 817–876. Ithaca, New York: Cornell University Press. ISBN 9780801438905.
- McKitterick, Rosamond (1983). The Frankish Kingdoms under the Carolingians, 751–987. London: Longman. ISBN 9780582490055.
