= Berthold of Ratisbon =

German monk (died 1272)

Berthold of Ratisbon was a Franciscan of the monastery of Ratisbon and the most powerful preacher of repentance in the thirteenth century.

== Biography ==
From the knowledge displayed in Berthold's sermons, the 1913 Catholic Encyclopedia speculates that Berthold likely entered his monastery at a mature age, having received a classical education in his youth. Based on this, the encyclopedia puts his birth around 1210, and his origin as a well-to-do middle-class family of Ratisbon named Sachs. The first fixed date in Berthold's life is 1246, when the papal legate appointed him and David of Augsburg as inspectors of the convent of Niedermünster.

A 1250 text by Hermann of Altach mentions Berthold's reputation in Bavaria as a preacher. Over the following decade and a half, Berthold preached throughout the valley of the Rhine, Alsace and Switzerland, and then eastward into Austria, Moravia, Bohemia and Silesia. In 1263, Pope Urban IV appointed Berthold to preach the Crusade, and Albert the Great was designated as his assistant.

A popular preacher among the common people, Berthold consistently drew crowds, numbering up to 100,000 listeners. Even in Slavonic areas, where he had to employ an interpreter, his audiences were frequently too large for the local churches. As a result, Berthold often preached outdoors; "Berthold's linden", in Glatz, was remembered as a frequent site of his sermons.

About 1270, Berthold seems to have returned to Ratisbon where he remained until his death on 14 December 1272. His relics are preserved in the cathedral at Ratisbon.

== Reputation and sermons ==
The Franciscan martyrology includes Berthold's name among the blessed of the order.

The poets and chroniclers of his time made frequent reference to Berthold. He was called "sweet Brother Berthold", "the beloved of God and man", "a second Elias", "the teacher of the nations"; all of these expressions are proofs of the high esteem in which his activities were held. The secret of the preacher's success lay partly in the saintliness of his life and partly in his power to make use of the language of humble life. He became the great master, it may be said, the classic of homely speech, and this rank has been maintained by his sermons to the present day. One of his two popular discourses on the Last Judgment became a favourite book of the people under the title "The Valley of Josaphat". There is no doubt that Brother Berthold preached in German.

For a long time scholars disagreed as to how his sermons had been preserved. It is now generally accepted that the sermons were often written down afterwards in Latin, frequently with marginal comments in German; these reports of the sermons, as they may be called, partly German, partly Latin, or at times in the language in which they were delivered, are what have been handed down to posterity.

The discourses thus preserved are of the greatest importance for the history of the development of the literature of homiletics; they are of equal value as rich sources for determining the condition of education and culture in the thirteenth century. It is difficult, therefore, to understand how this greatest of German preachers to the poor could have been forgotten for centuries. It was not until some of Brother Berthold's sermons were published in 1824 that attention was called to the eloquent Franciscan. Since this date, the enthusiasm for Berthold grew steadily so that he has become a favourite, both of Germanic scholars and of the historians of the development of German civilization. He is also regarded as the great pattern of homely pulpit eloquence.
