= Series ducum Bavariae =

Latin regnal list

Series in Vienna 413

The Series or Catalogus ducum Bavariae ("Series/catalogue of Dukes of Bavaria") is a Latin regnal list of the Duchy of Bavaria compiled between 1250 and 1273. It covers the succession to the duchy from a semi-legendary "Theodo I" in 514 to 1244, when Otto II Wittelsbach was duke.

The autograph manuscript from the Abbey of Niederaltaich survives in Vienna, Austrian National Library, Cod. 413. Copies are found in Vienna MSS 546 and 380 and Clm 18770, 14053 and 14594. Of the various regnal lists copied at Niederalteich during the abbacy of Hermann (1242–1273), only that of the Bavarian dukes was actually composed there. The autograph contains several names and notices added directly by Hermann himself.

The Series is an important source for these early dukes, but it is frequently unsynchronised with the earlier chronicles. About the Agilolfing dynasty it states that the dux primus (first duke) was Theodo I and gives his year as 514. It then lists Theodo II, Garibald I (Garibaldus rex), Tassilo I, Theodo III (quem sanctus Ruodbertus baptizavit, "whom Saint Rupert baptised"), Theodebert, Theodo IV (qui cum filiis sanctum Corbiniacum locavit Frisinge, "who with the sons of Saint Corbinian chose the location of Freising"), Theobald, Grimoald (Theobald's nephew, fratris filius), Hugpert, Udilo (cum Theodone frater, "with Theodo his brother"), Thassilo dux II (cum filio eius Theodone, "with his son Theodo").

== Editions ==
- Georg Waitz, ed. "Series ducum Bavariae." Monumenta Germaniae Historica, Scriptores 24, (1879), pp. 73–74.
