= Hartwig (given name) =

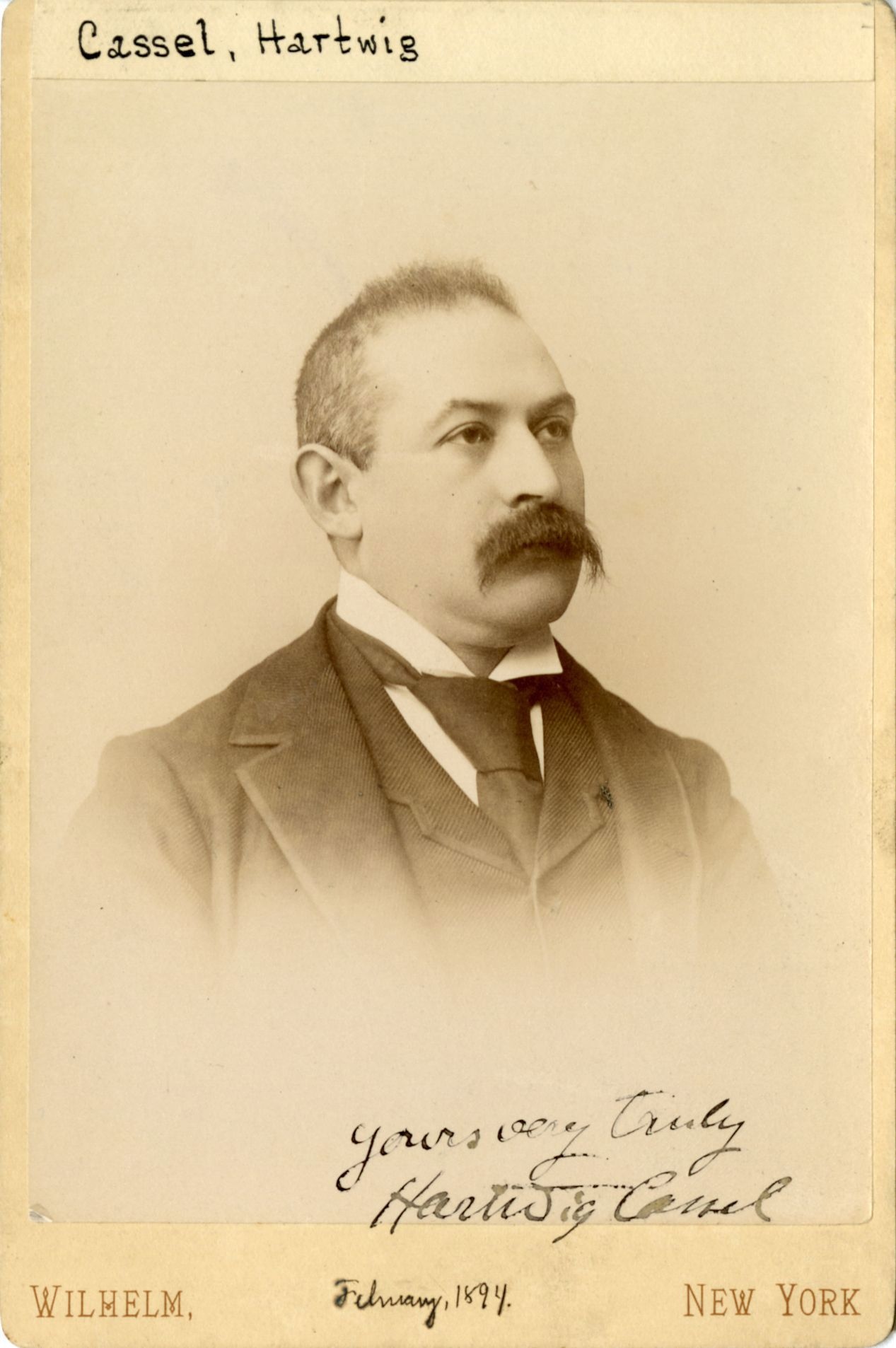

Hartwig (Latin Hartwicus) is a masculine given name of Germanic origin. It may refer to:

- Hartwig (bishop of Passau) (died 866)
- Hartwig (bishop of Basel) (died 870)
- Hartwig (abbot of Megingaudshausen) (died 892)
- Hartwig (archbishop of Salzburg) (died 1023)
- Hartwig (bishop of Brixen) (died 1039)
- Hartwig (bishop of Bamberg) (died 1053)
- Hartwig (abbot of Hersfeld) (died 1088)
- Hartwig (archbishop of Magdeburg) (died 1102)
- Hartwig I (bishop of Regensburg) (died 1126)
- Hartwig II (bishop of Regensburg) (died 1164)
- Hartwig, Count of Stade (1118–1168), archbishop of Bremen
- Hartwig I (archbishop of Augsburg) (died 1184)
- Hartwig of Uthlede (died 1207), archbishop of Bremen
- Hartwig II (archbishop of Augsburg) (died 1208)
- Hartwig von Grögling-Dollnstein (died 1223), bishop of Eichstätt
- Hartwig I, Count Palatine of Bavaria (died 985)
- Hartwig II, Count Palatine of Bavaria (died 1027)
- Hartwig Altenmüller
- Hartwig Bleidick
- Hartwig Cassel
- Hartwig Derenbourg
- Hartwig Gauder
- Hartwig Naftali Carlebach
- Hartwig Steenken
- Hartwig von Ludwiger
- Hartwig von Raute
