= Ermanrich of Passau =

Ermanrich or Ermenrich (Hermanrich; born c. 814 – 874) was a Benedictine monk and court chaplain, who became Bishop of Passau from 866 to 874. He supported East Francia's expansion to the east, and likewise the expansion of the eastern bishoprics, and opposed the missionary efforts of Cyril and Methodius, who he considered intruders. This brought him into conflict with the Papacy, which supported the brother missionaries.

== Life ==
Ermenrich, son of a Swabian noble family, was originally a Benedictine monk at Ellwangen Abbey. At the Monastery of Fulda he was a student of Rabanus Maurus and Rudolf von Fulda. At the court of Louis the German, Ermanrich was one of Archchaplain Gozbald's students. He became a member of the Hofkapelle, and as a court chaplain was closely connected with Abbot Grimald, in whose monastery he lived temporarily.

Ermenrich enjoyed great respect both as a scholar and as a writer. In the early 840's, at the request of Gundram, court chaplain to Louis the Pious and nephew of Rabanus Maurus, Ermenrich wrote the Vita Suaolonis of Saint Solus of Solnhofen, an Anglo-Saxon missionary of Fulda. A few years later, he composed a Vita Hariolfi, a biography of Hariolf, the founder of Ellwangen Abbey, and dedicated it to his former teacher, Gozbald, a relative of Hariolf.

In the early 850's Ermenrich was living at the Abbey of Saint Gall. In an extensive letter to Grimald, which was intended for a wider circle of readers, he also showed Greek knowledge and conceived a planned but not preserved metric Vita S. Galli. The Collectio Pataviensis probably does not originate from him.

In 862 or 863, old Bishop Hartwig of Passau suffered a serious stroke, that left him largely disabled, and in 866 Ermanrich was chosen to succeed him as new Bishop of Passau. In his time, great efforts were made to integrate newly Christianized areas in the eastern part of the church organization of the Diocese of Passau. In 867 Louis the German commissioned Bishop Ermanrich and a numerous retinue of priests to set out for the Danube. When Ermanrich reached Bulgaria, he found the field already occupied by priests from Rome, and returned to Germany. The project failed because of the rivalry with Constantinople as to the jurisdiction over the territory of the Slavs. The rulers of Moravia and Bulgaria played off Rome and Constantinople against each other in order to maintain independence from both the Franks and the Greeks.

Ermenrich attended the Synod of Worms (868) in 868. In 870 Ermenrich took part in the proceedings of the Bavarian episcopate against the Moravian Archbishop Methodius, which led to the arrest of Methodius, who they considered an intruder.

However, the missionary work of Methodius and his brother had great success among Slavs in part because they used the people's native language rather than Latin or Greek. Pope Adrian II had consecrated Methodius as archbishop and supported his mission to the Slavs. Unbeknownst to Rome, Methodius was imprisoned in 870 in an abbey in Germany by King Louis the German and the East Frankish bishops: Adalwin of Salzburg, Ermanrich of Passau, and Anno of Freising who objected to his use of the Old Church Slavonic in the liturgy and his encroachment on their jurisdiction in Moravia. Adrian II died in 872, and Pope John VIII, was chosen to succeed him. When Bishop Anno of Freising visited Rome, John inquired about the whereabouts of the missing Methodius, but Anno lied to him. In the summer of 873, John finally learned the truth. Furious, he forbade the celebration of mass in Bavaria until Methodius was released.

Ermenrich was suspended from office and died in 874.

== Sources ==
- Bowlus, Charles R. (1995). Franks, Moravians, and Magyars: The Struggle for the Middle Danube, 788-907. Philadelphia: University of Pennsylvania Press. ISBN 9780812232769.
- Goldberg, Eric Joseph (2006). Struggle for Empire: Kingship and Conflict Under Louis the German, 817-876. Cornell University Press. ISBN 080143890X.
