= Herulph =

Catholic bishop in 8th century

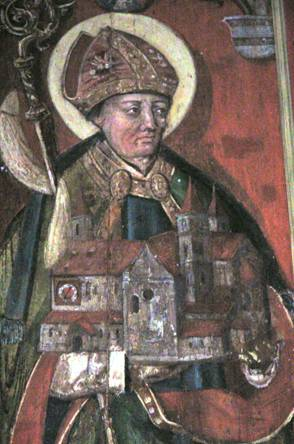

Blessed
- Born: c. 730; Ellwangen
- Died: 815; Ellwangen
- Venerated in: Roman Catholicism
- Feast: December 13

Herulph (†815) (Herulphe, Hariolf, Hariolfus) was a Benedictine of the Abbey of St. Gall who founded Ellwangen Abbey. He is a Catholic saint; his feast day is December 13.

== Life ==
Herulph was born about 730 in Ellwangen near Stuttgart. He was the son of the Count of Ellwangen, and related to Gozbald, archchaplain and chancellor to Louis the German.

Herulph and his brother Erlolf became Benedictine monks of the Abbey of St. Gall in Switzerland. Around 750 he and his brother founded the monastery of Ellwangen. Herulph became the first abbot.

In 759, Erlolf became Bishop of Langres in France and sent relics of SS. Speosippus, Eleosippus and Meleosippus to Ellwangen. In 773, he sent Herulph relics of SS. Sulpicius and Servilian, which he had obtained from Pope Adrian I, and they became the main patron saints of the first monastic church.

Herulph assisted at the Lateran Council (769), and became chorbishop of Langres in 772. Erlolf died in 785 and was buried in the monastery church of St Vitus at Ellwangen. He is commemorated on August 13. Herulph resigned as bishop around 778 and retired to Ellwangen, where he died in 815. He also was buried at St. Vitus.

A Vita Hariolfi was written by the Benedictine monk, Ermanrich of Passau.
