= Marianus Bieber =

Marianus Bieber (OSB), born 23 June 1958 in Aschaffenburg, Germany. After finishing school in 1977 Bieber studied philosophy of religion, Catholic theology and German studies at the Goethe University Frankfurt. In 1987 he received his master's degree. In 1989 Bieber joined the Niederaltaich Abbey. He worked there for two years as a youth and a community worker. 1995 Bieber was consecrated as a Priest by Maximilian Aichern OSB. Since 2001 Marianus Bieber is the Abbot of the Niederaltaich Abbey as the successor of Emmanuel Jungclaussen OSB. In the same year Bieber earned the Doctor of Theology with the thesis Theologie der Innerlichkeit. Zur philosophischen Begründung von Glauben und Offenbarung aus den Differenzsymptomen von Raum und Zeit (which was firstly published in 2003).

Marianus Bieber is a member of the Order of the Holy Sepulchre.
