= Hartwig of Passau =

Tenth Bishop of Passau

Hartwig (died 866) was the tenth Bishop of Passau from 840 to 866.

Hartwig was the head of the Königskloster Tegernsee, and perhaps a member of the Hofkapelle and a family member of King Ludwig of Germany.

In 862 or 863 he suffered a serious stroke, and spent his remaining years largely disabled. In 866, he was succeeded by Ermanrich as new Bishop of Passau.

== Sources ==
- Bowlus, Charles R. (1995). Franks, Moravians, and Magyars: The Struggle for the Middle Danube, 788-907. Philadelphia: University of Pennsylvania Press. ISBN 9780812232769.
