= Niederaltaich Abbey =

Bavarian monastery

Coordinates: 48°45′58″N 13°01′40″E

Niederaltaich Abbey (Abtei or Kloster Niederaltaich) is a house of the Benedictine Order founded in 741, situated in the village of Niederalteich on the Danube in Bavaria. (Note: "Niederaltaich" is the conventional spelling of the monastery, "Niederalteich" of the village.) It belongs to the Bavarian Congregation.

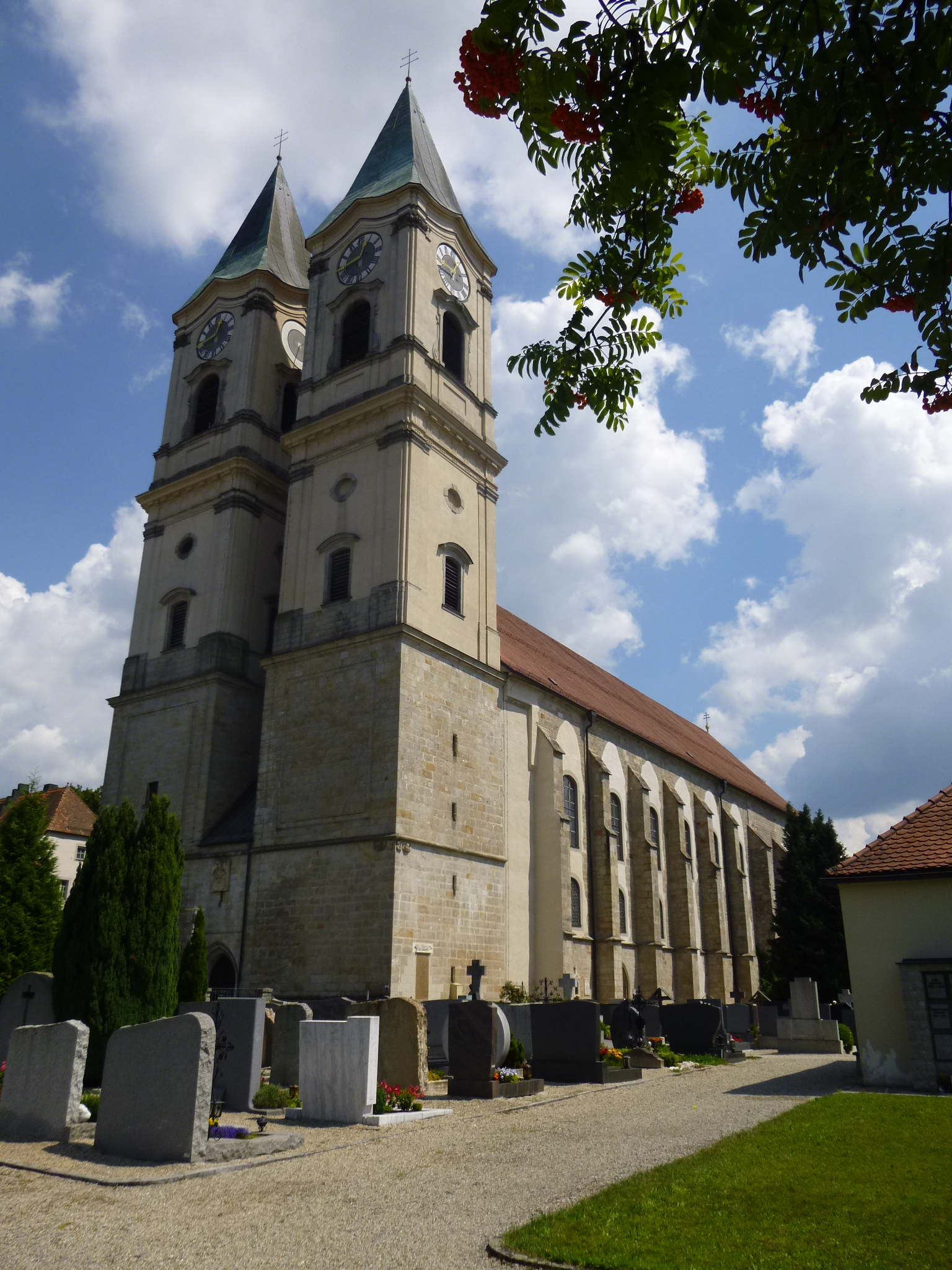
The church of the abbey

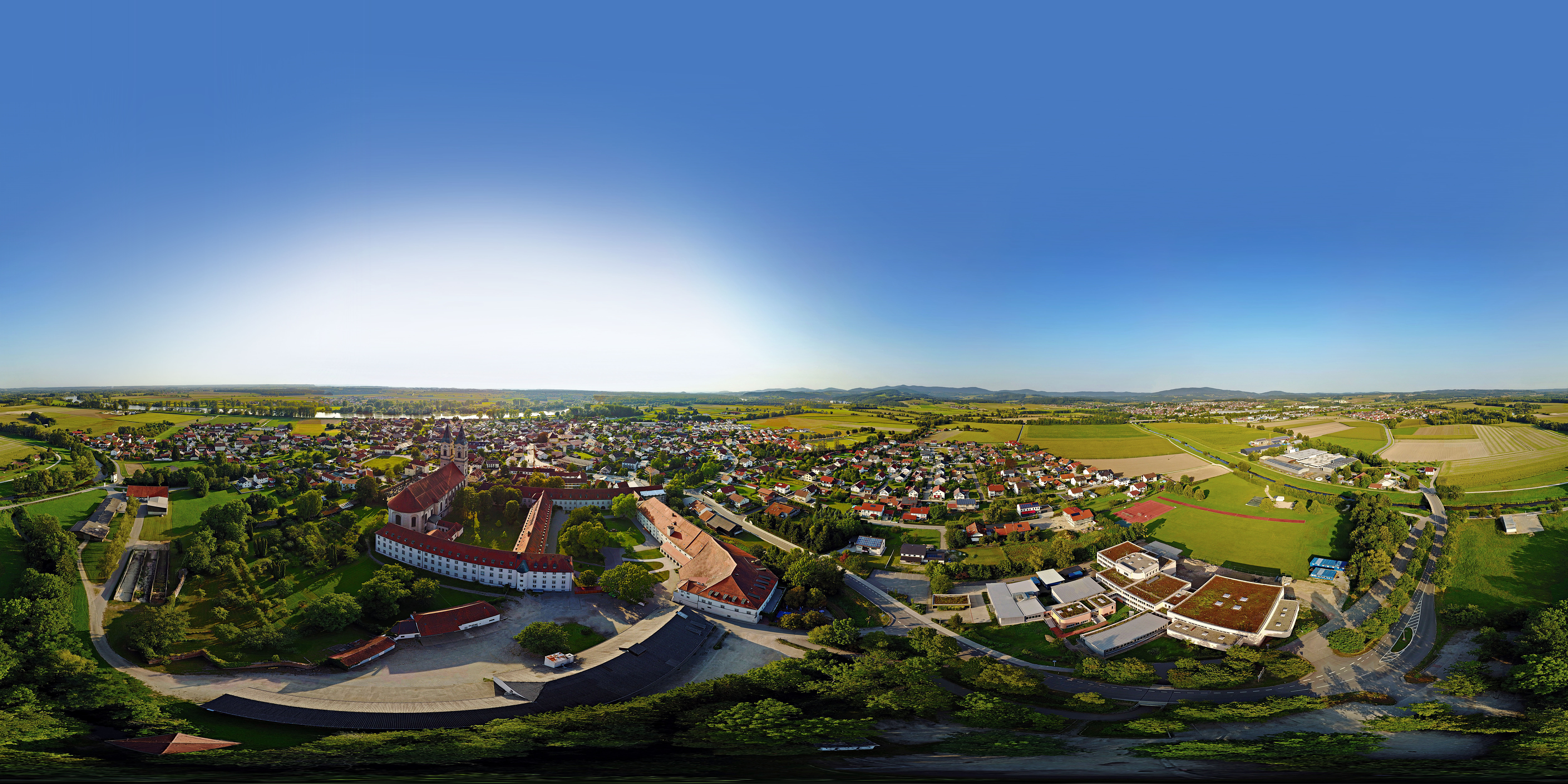
A 360° Panorama of Niederalteich (Bavaria) and especially the Benedictine Abbey Niederaltaich

== Foundation and early history ==
After its foundation in 741 by Duke Odilo of Bavaria, the monastery, dedicated to Saint Maurice, was settled by monks from Reichenau Abbey under Saint Pirmin. Eberswind, the first abbot, is considered the compiler of the "Lex Baiuvariorum", the first code of law of the Bavarian people.

The monastery brought great areas of Lower Bavaria into cultivation as far as the territory of the present Czech Republic, and founded 120 settlements in the Bavarian Forest. In the reigns of Charlemagne and Louis the German the abbey extended its possessions as far as the Wachau. Abbot Gozbald (825–855) was the latter's arch-chancellor.

In 848 the monastery received the right of free election of its abbots, and in 857 became reichsunmittelbar (that is, free of all territorial lordship except that of the monarchy itself). By the end of the 9th century over 50 monks had become abbots in other monasteries or been appointed bishops. The 10th century however brought the turmoil of the Hungarian incursions, and between 950 and 990 the abbey was a collegiate foundation (Kollegiatstift).

Under Abbot Gotthard or Godehard of Hildesheim (996–1022), better known as Saint Gotthard, the abbey entered a renewed golden age. Saint Gotthard, who along with Duke Henry of Bavaria, later Emperor Henry II, was a key supporter of contemporary monastic reform, was probably the abbey's best-known abbot. He later became Bishop of Hildesheim, where he was buried.

The abbey was granted by Emperor Frederick Barbarossa to the Bishop of Bamberg in 1152, and as a consequence lost its reichsunmittelbar status. In 1242 the Wittelsbachs inherited from the Counts of Bogen the office of Vogt (lord protector) of the abbey.

Important abbots from this time on were Hermann (in office from 1242 to 1273), the author of the "Annales Hermanni", and the Reformation abbots Kilian Weybeck (1503 to 1534) and Paulus Gmainer (1550 to 1585). Construction of the Gothic monastery church was begun in 1260 under Abbot Herman. Vitus Bacheneder, abbot between 1651 and 1666, created after the Thirty Years' War the foundations of the economic prosperity of the abbey in the Baroque period. Under Abbot Joscio Hamberger (1700–1739) the creation of the Baroque abbey and church took place, as well as the construction of the school. The church was the first commission for the later famous Baroque architect Johann Michael Fischer, who worked on it from 1724–1726.

== Later history ==
The abbey was dissolved at the secularisation of Bavaria in 1803. A fire in the church in 1813, caused by a bolt of lightning, signalled the beginning of the demolition of the Baroque complex. The monastery buildings were sold off to private individuals. The side chapels of the abbey church, the Gothic cloisters and adjoining buildings, as well as the parish church, were demolished.

In 1918, with the help of a legacy from the theology professor Franz Xaver Knabenbauer, a native of Niederalteich, a monastery was re-established here and settled from Metten Abbey. In 1932 the monastery church received from the pope the title of "Basilica minor".

In 1949, under Abbot Emmanuel Maria Heufelder, the monastery became once again an independent abbey.

In 1946 the St.-Gotthard-Gymnasium ("St.-Gotthard-Grammar School") was refounded after having been closed by the Nazis. The remaining parts of the Baroque buildings were incorporated into new buildings in 1953–1954 and gradually renovated. In 1959 the Katholische Landvolkshochschule ("Catholic State Secondary School") was established here, and between 1971 and 1973 a new school building was erected for the St.-Gotthard-Gymnasium because the number of pupils had continually risen in the 1960s. Its boarding facilities, however, were shut down in 1994 and converted in 1999–2001 into the St. Pirmin Conference and Hospitality Centre. In 2006 and 2007 the school building of the St.-Gotthard-Gymnasium was refurbished. The school itself is now a Ganztagschule, which provides obligatory lessons from 7.45 a.m. until 4.00 p.m..

Niederaltaich Abbey has been a member of the Bavarian Congregation of the Benedictine Confederation since its re-foundation in 1918.

Interior of Abbey Church

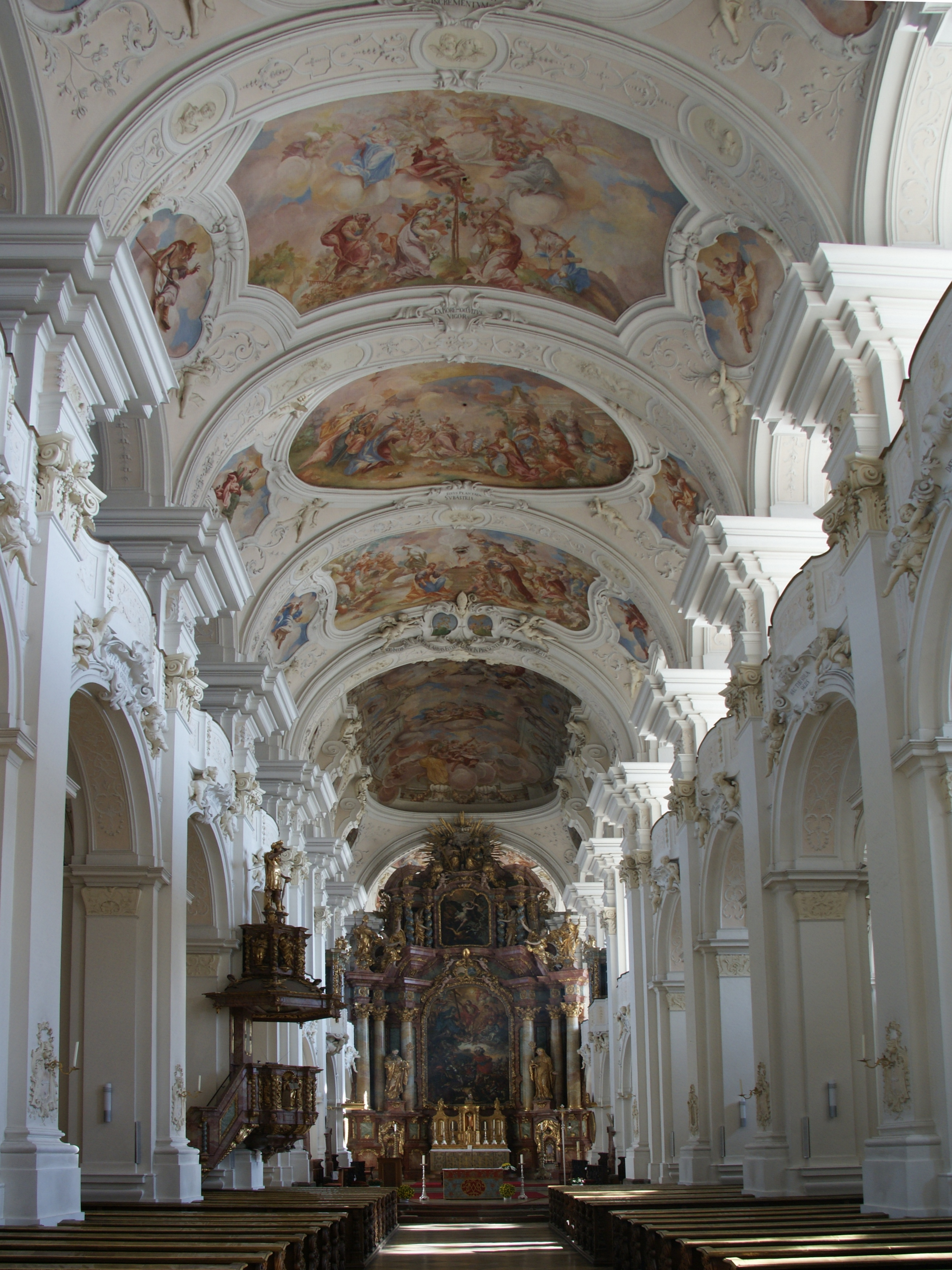

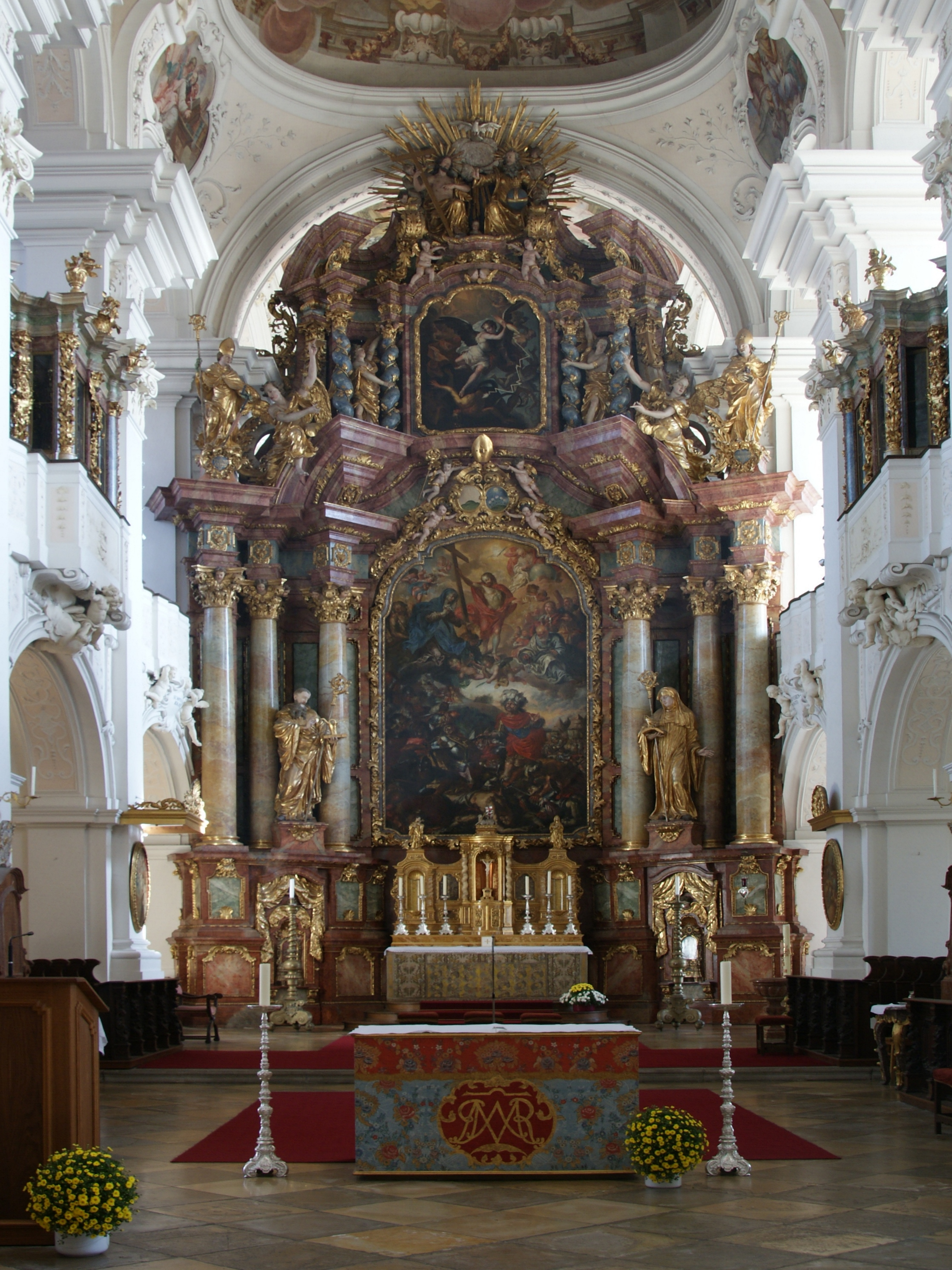

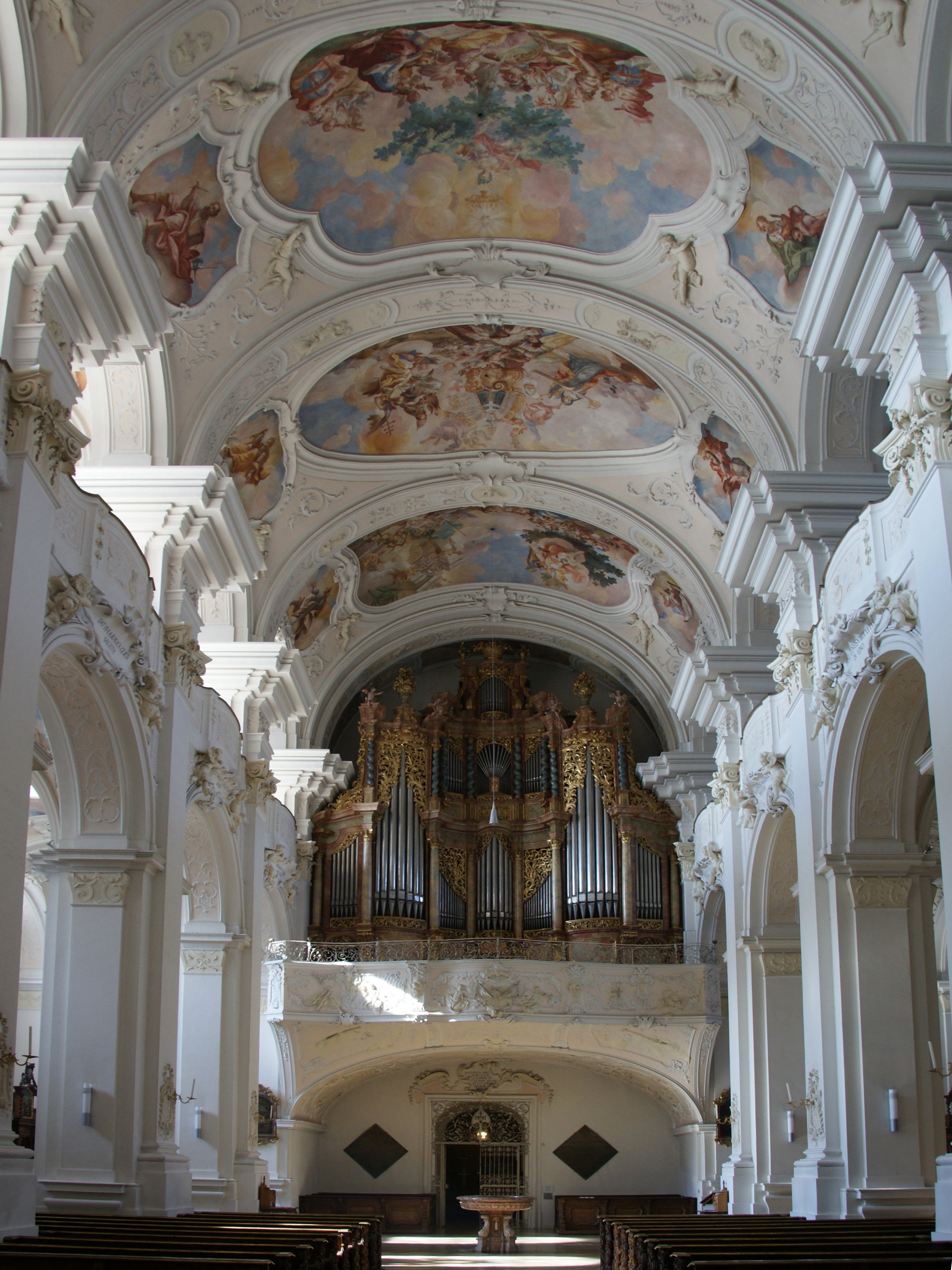

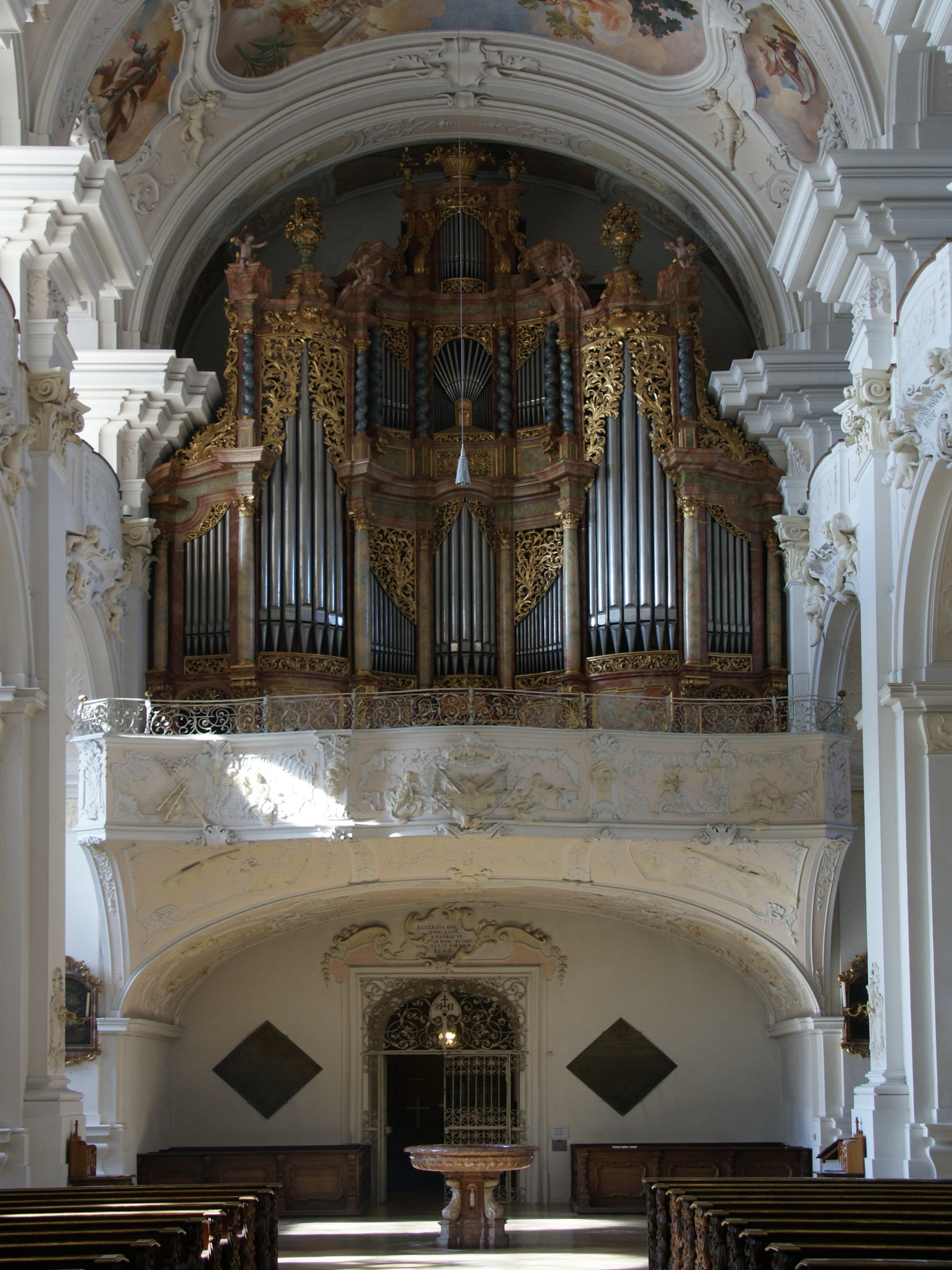

== Byzantine Catholicism ==
In 1924 Pope Pius XI gave the Benedictines the task of making the theology and spirituality of the east known in the west.

Niederaltaich, as a consequence of these ecumenical goals, has since been a monastery of two ecclesasiatical traditions or rites, one part of the monks living and praying according to the Roman rite, the other part according to the Byzantine rite.

The Eucharist and the Divine Office are celebrated by the monks in the German language in both rites, and in addition, liturgical texts from Church Slavonic and Greek have also been translated.

In 1986 a church and a chapel, both dedicated to Bishop Nicholas of Myra (Saint Nicholas), were set up for the celebration of the Byzantine rite in the buildings of the former monastery brewery.

== List of abbots ==
=== Original abbey ===
1. Eberswind, 741–768
2. Wolfbert I, 768–788
3. Urolfus (Fulradus), 788–814
4. Teutpold, 814–822
5. Ottgar I, 822–847
6. Gozbald, 847–855
7. Ottgar II, 855–881
8. Wolfbert II
9. Eberswind II
10. Grimoald
11. Ottbald
12. Chunibert
13. Egilolph
14. Aaron
15. Erchambert, 990–997
16. Gotthard of Hildesheim, 997–1022 (died 1038)
17. Wolfram I, 1023–1025
18. Ratmund, 1027–1049
19. Dietmar I, 1049–1055
20. Adelhard, 1055–1062
21. Wenzeslaus, 1063–1068
22. Walker (Walther), 1068–1098
23. Wolfram II, 1098–1100
24. Rupert II, 1100–1118
25. Luitpold, 1118–1131
26. Adalfried, 1131–1143
27. Conrad I, 1143–1150
28. Boleslaus, 1150–1160
29. Dietrich
30. Gerhard
31. Wolsgalkus (Volsthalkus)
32. Ulrich, 1173–1178
33. Dietmar II, 1179–1202
34. Poppo I, 1202–1229
35. Berthold, 1229
36. Conrad II, 1229–1232
37. Dietmar III, 1232–1242
38. Hermann, 1242–1273 (died 1275)
39. Albinus, 1273–1279
40. Volkmar, 1280–1282
41. Poppo II, 1282–1289
42. Wernhard, 1289–1317
43. Friedrich Süß, 1317–1322 (died 1335)
44. Ruger von Degenberg, 1323–1335
45. Otto I de Turri, 1335–1343
46. Peter I, 1343–1361
47. Otto II, 1361–1366
48. Altmann von Degenberg, 1367–1402
49. Johann I, 1402–1414
50. Johann II Kuchelmund, 1414–1434
51. Erhard Reittorner, 1434–1452 (died 1465)
52. Albert Tanner, 1452–1454
53. Peter II von Münichsdorf, 1454–1466 (died 1483)
54. Wolfgang Pausinger, 1466–1475
55. Friedrich II, 1475–1491
56. Johann III Simerl, 1491–1502
57. Bernhard II Lichtenstern, 1502
58. Kilian I (Andreas) Weybeck, 1503–1534
59. Viktor Lauser, 1534–1535
60. Kaspar Leutgeb, 1536–1546
61. Mathias Denscherz, 1546–1550
62. Paulus Gmainer, 1550–1585
63. Augustin I (Christoph) Strobl, 1585–1592
64. Quirin (Balthasar) Grasenauer, 1592
65. Bernhard III Hilz, 1593–1619
66. Johann IV Heinrich, 1619–1634
67. Johann V Grienwald, 1634–1648 (died 1662)
68. Tobias Gmainer, 1648–1651 (died 1657)
69. Vitus Bacheneder, 1651–1666
70. Placidus I (Christoph) Krammer, 1667–1672 (died 1697)
71. Adalbert (Mathias) Guggomos, 1672–1694
72. Karl Kögl, 1695–1700
73. Joscio (Kaspar Benno) Hamberger, 1700–1739
74. Marianus (Georg Albert) Pusch, 1739–1746
75. Franz von Dyrnhard, 1746–1751
76. Ignaz I (Lorenz) Lanz, 1751–1764
77. Augustin II (Johann Baptist) Ziegler, 1764–1775 (died 1778)
78. Ignaz II Krenauer, 1775–1799
79. Kilian II Gubitz, 1799–1803 (died 1824)

=== Restored abbey ===
- Gislar Stieber, 1930–1937
- Corbinian Hofmeister, 1937–1949
- Emmanuel Maria Heufelder, 1949–1968
- Ansgar Ahlbrecht, 1968–1969
- Placidus II Stieß, 1970–1989
- Emmanuel Jungclaussen, 1989–2001
- Marianus Bieber, since 2001

== See also ==
- List of Carolingian monasteries
- Carolingian architecture
- Carolingian art
