= Janneke Raaijmakers =

Dutch historian (1973–2021)

- Born: 28 June 1973; Hilversum, Netherlands
- Died: 2 May 2021 (aged 47); Utrecht, Netherlands

Academic background
- Education: Utrecht University (B.A.); University of Amsterdam (Ph.D.)
- Thesis: Sacred Time, Sacred Space. History and Identity at the monastery of Fulda (744–856) (2003)

Academic work
- Discipline: Medieval history
- Sub-discipline: Christian monasticism

Janneke Ellen Raaijmakers (Hilversum, 28 June 1973 - Utrecht, 2 May 2021) was a Dutch historian of the Middle Ages who specialized in the formation of monastic communities and the role of religious objects in the cult of the saints, with a particular focus on Fulda and the Fulda monastery, founded by Saint Boniface.

Raaijmakers received her Ph.D. from the University of Amsterdam in 2003; her dissertation, Sacred Time, Sacred Space. History and Identity at the monastery of Fulda (744–856), investigates the Fulda monastery including the relics it acquired and their function, and the monastery's position in the "sacred landscape" of the Carolingians. Between 2005 and 2010 she did postdoctoral research on Saint Boniface and the role his life and work played in the building and transformation of various monastic communities. She has published on various aspects of monastic and religious life, including necrologies. Her The Making of the Monastic Community of Fulda, c. 744 – c. 900 was published by Cambridge University Press in 2012 and offered a "multidimensional portrait of [this] influential monastery".

Later in her career, Raaijmakers focused on the function of religious objects in the medieval West, particularly relics and their veneration. She was an editor of the Dutch history journal Madoc. Raaijmakers died from cancer on 2 May 2021.
