= Solnhofen =

Municipality in Germany

- Municipality
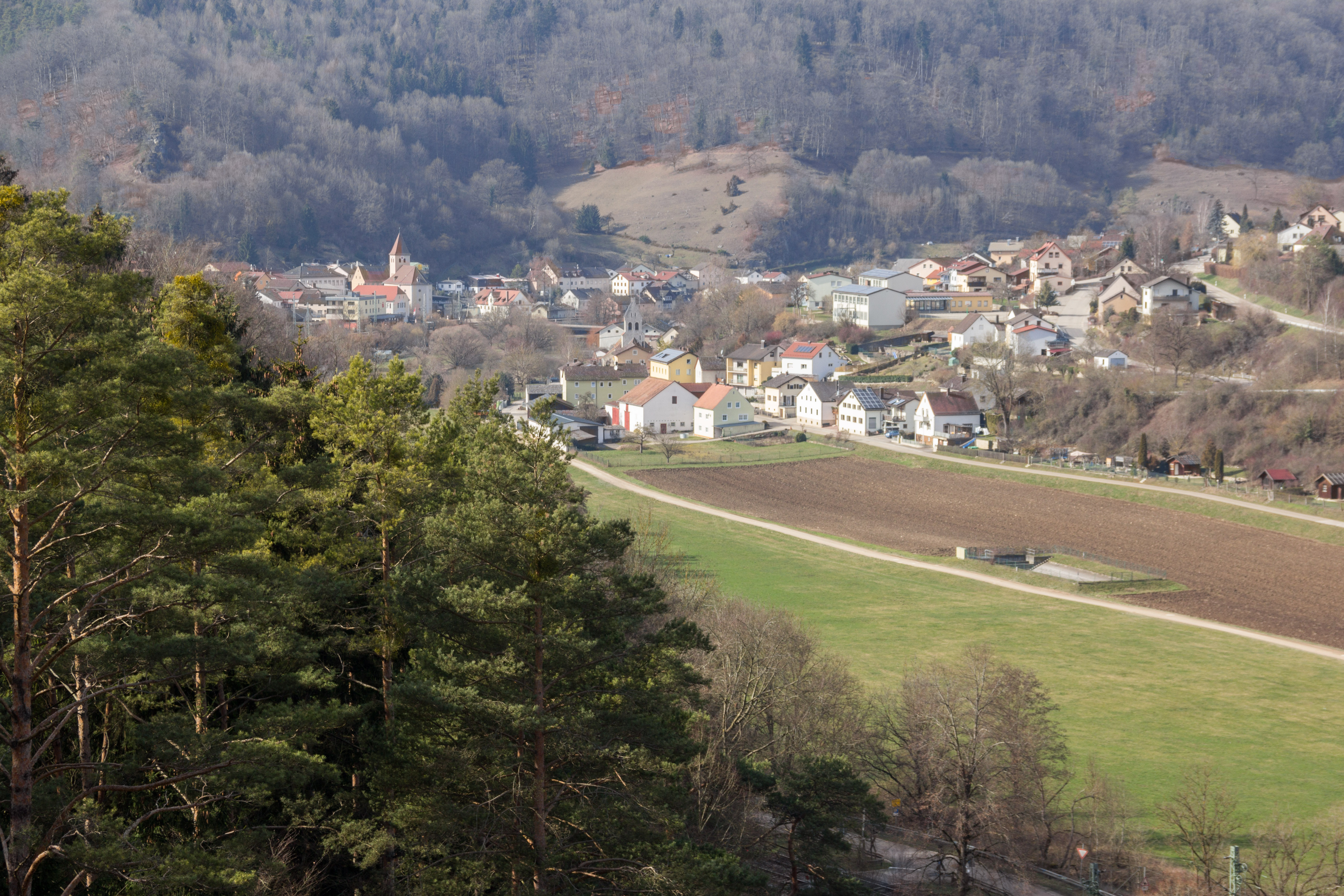
- View on Solnhofen

- Coat of arms

- Location of Solnhofen within Weißenburg-Gunzenhausen district
- Interactive map of Solnhofen
- Location within Germany Location within Bavaria
- Coordinates: 48°53′N 11°0′E
- Country: Germany
- State: Bavaria
- Admin. region: Mittelfranken
- District: Weißenburg-Gunzenhausen
- Subdivisions: 3 Gemeindeteile

Government
  - Mayor (2020–26): Tobias Eberle (SPD)

Area
  - Total: 13.50 km^{2} (5.21 sq mi)
- Elevation: 410 m (1,350 ft)

Population (2025-12-31)
  - Total: 1,784
  - Density: 132.1/km^{2} (342.3/sq mi)
- Time zone: UTC+01:00 (CET)
  - Summer (DST): UTC+02:00 (CEST)
- Postal codes: 91807
- Dialling codes: 09145
- Vehicle registration: WUG
- Website: www.solnhofen.de

Solnhofen is a municipality in the district of Weißenburg-Gunzenhausen in the region of Middle Franconia in the Land of Bavaria in Germany. It is in the Altmühl valley.

The local area is famous in geology and palaeontology for Solnhofen limestone. This is a very fine-grained limestone from the Jurassic period Lagerstätte that preserves detailed fossil specimens. Alois Senefelder used specially prepared blocks of the fine Solnhofen limestone for the process of lithography which he invented in 1798. The quarrying of this lithographic limestone subsequently yielded spectacular finds, including Archaeopteryx, commemorated in the bird's full name Archaeopteryx lithographica. All 14 known specimens have come from the Solnhofen area.

== Geography ==
Solnhofen is located on the Altmühl in Bavaria. It contains two districts: Hochholz and Eßlingen. It is adjacent to the municipalities Pappenheim, Langenaltheim, and Mörnsheim.

== History ==
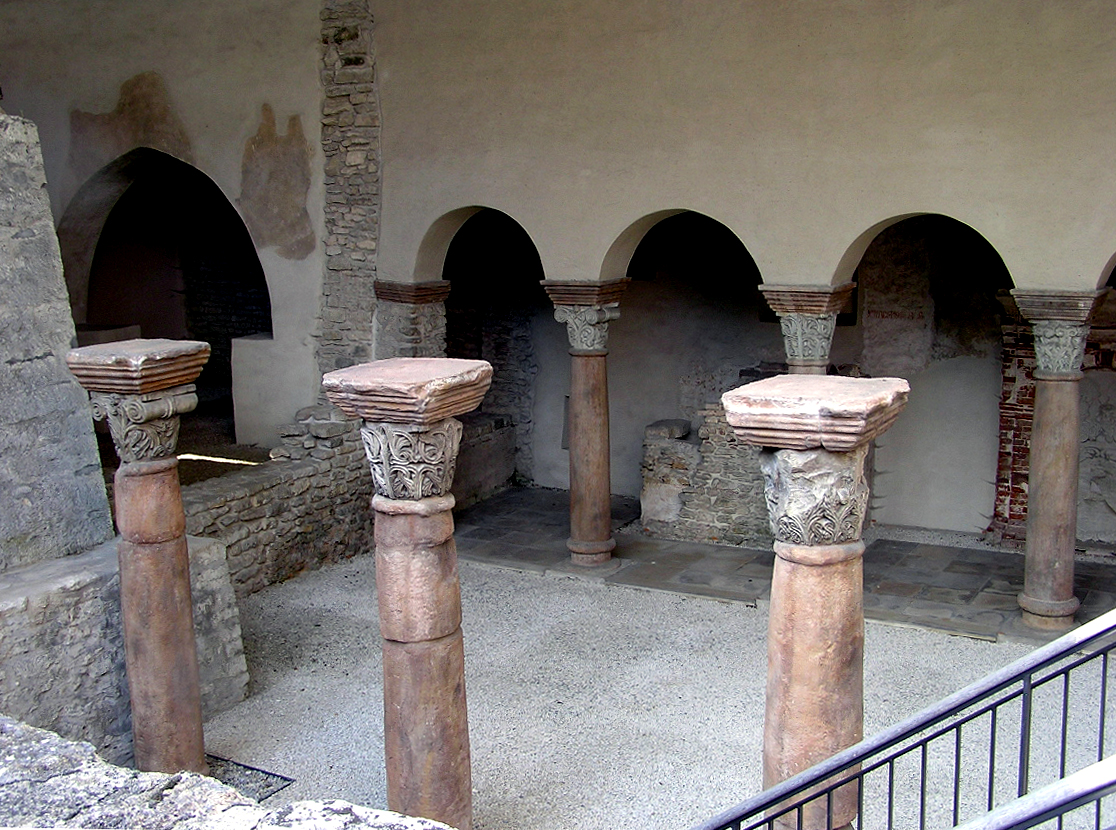
The Sola-Basilica

Solnhofen was known as "Husen" in the eighth century. In 750/51 Saint Solus created a church there. His grave church (Sola-Basilika) was later built on the site. In honor of him Husen was renamed "Solnhofen". In 1420 Solnhofen was burnt down during the Bavarian War. It also suffered through the Thirty Years' War. From 1649 to the 18th century there was a glass industry in Solnhofen. In 1785 the St Veit church was erected partly on the ruins of the old grave church. In 1870 the train station was opened. From 1903 to 1905 the Catholic St Sola church was built. In 1970 the Bürgermeister-Müller-Museum was opened.

== Sights ==
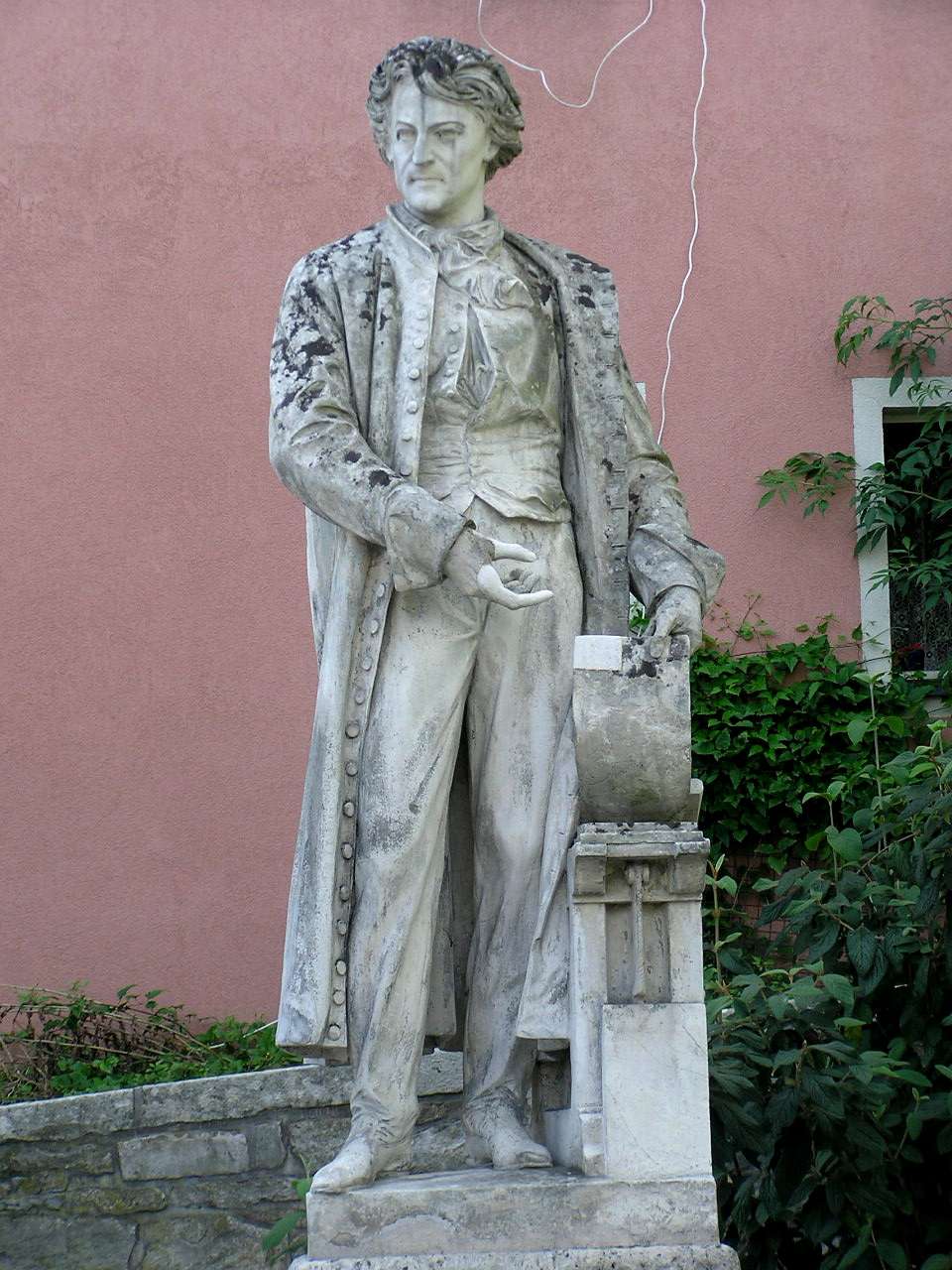
The Alois Senefelder monument in Solnhofen

The Sola Basilica dating from the Carolingian period is one of the finest architectural monuments in Germany. It is the grave church of Saint Solus. Close to it is the St Veit church that was built in 1785.

As well as celebrating its role as the "hometown" of Archaeopteryx, Solnhofen also commemorates the work of Alois Senefelder with a statue of the inventor by Hippolyte Maindron

The Bürgermeister Müller Museum in Solnhofen displays the history of lithography, the story of the limestone quarries, and the spectacular fossil finds from the area, including the most recently discovered Archaeopteryx specimen.

The Catholic St Sola church, built in early Gothic style of Jurassic limestones, was opened in 1905.

== Notable people ==
- Richard Arauner (1902–1936), Oberführer in the Waffen-SS
- Hermann von Meyer (1801–1869)
