= Saint Solus =

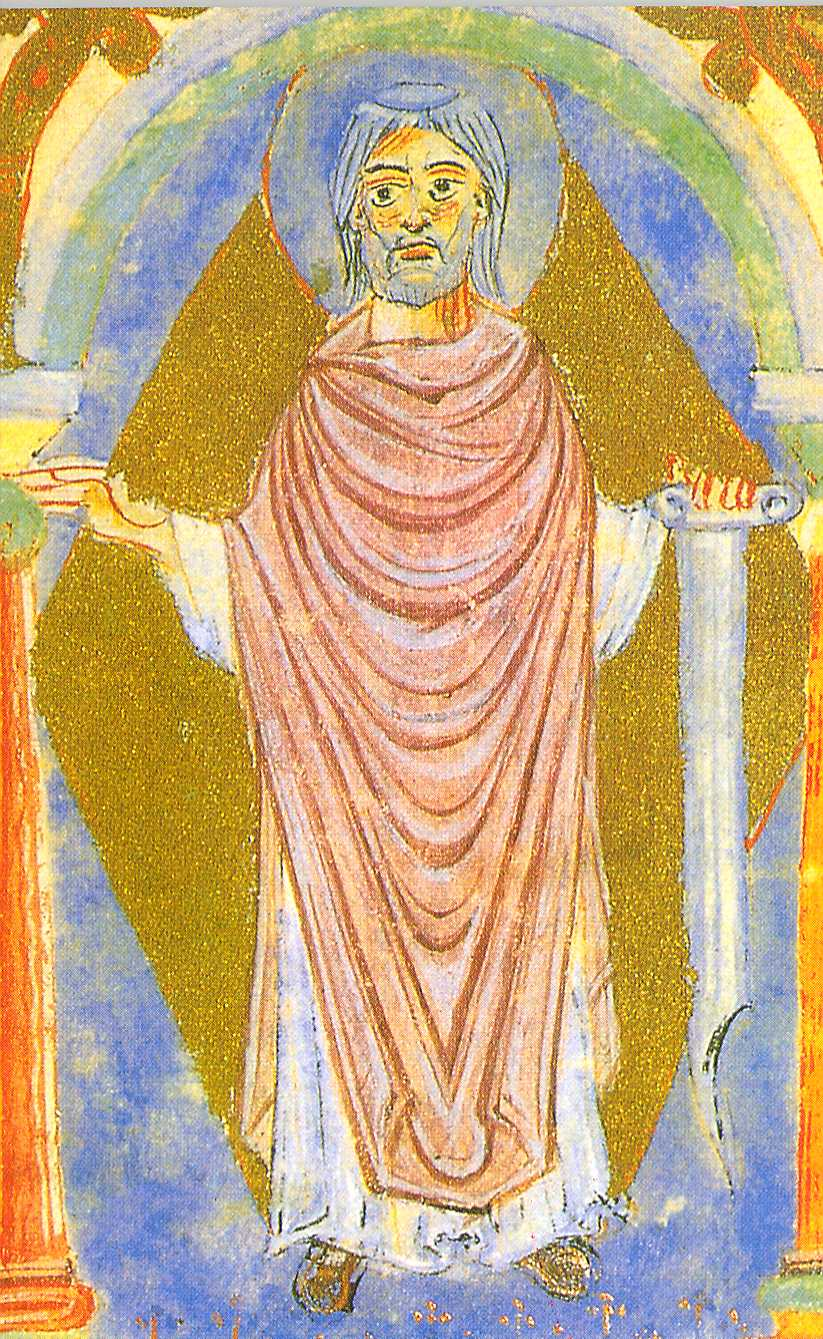
- 11th century icon of St Solus

Hieromonk
- Died: c. 790 - 794
- Venerated in: Catholic Church
- Feast: 3 December

Saint Solus (also Sualo, Sola) (d. c. 790-794) was an English monk, in Germany with St. Boniface.

== Life ==
Solus was from southern England. In 744, he went to the Monastery of Fulda where he was ordained priest by Saint Boniface, became a monk, and established himself in a cell at Solnhofen in Suabia. There he built an oratory, a small oratory on a site near a former Roman quarry, and worked as a missionary.

In 793 Charlemagne visited Sola on his journey from Regensburg to the royal court in Weißenburg. The monk's reputation for holiness caused Charlemagne to make him a grant of the land where he had set up his hermitage. Solus then bestowed it as a cell on Fulda Abbey. He died about 790 and was buried at the northern outer wall of his church. His feast was celebrated on 3 December.

== Veneration ==
A life of Solus was written in the ninth century by Ermanrich of Ellwangen, sometime between 836 and 842. He claimed to have derived his information from an old servant of the saint. It was written at the request of his friend Gundram, former court chaplain to Louis the Pious and nephew of the Fulda abbot (and later archbishop of Mainz) Hrabanus Maurus.

In 833, Gundram was sent to Solnhofen to take charge of the newly founded Benedictine provostry of Solnhofen and the royal estate. With the permission of Bishop Altuin of Eichstätt, he raised Sola's bones and reburied them in the northern aisle of the basilica. This act effected the canonization of Solas. "Ermenrich knew almost nothing about the saint, but turned his biography into a political and ecclesiastical tool to legitimize Sualo's hermitage and its important place in Carolingian-era missions." Not having much historical information regarding Solus, Ermanrich focuses first on Solus' connection with Boniface, and secondly, with the sacred landscape where he established his hermitage.

The Vita Suaolonis was later printed by Luc D'Achery, and in Jean Mabillon's Acta Sanctorum Ordinis S. Benedicti, III, ii. 389–98, ed. Venice, 1734.

Sola is the particular patron saint of all heavy labourers in the juridical diocese of Eichstätt. He is also the namesake of the local Catholic church.

== Notes ==
Attribution

This article incorporates text from a publication now in the public domain: Lee, Sidney, ed. (1898). "Solus". Dictionary of National Biography. Vol. 53. London: Smith, Elder & Co.

== Sources ==
- "Ermanrici Sermo de vita s. Sualonis dicto Soli", ed. O. Holder-Egger, in: Monumenta Germaniae Historica Scriptores XV/1, pp. 151-163
