= Hermann of Altach =

Hermann of Altach (1200 or 1201 – 31 July 1275) was a medieval historian. He received his education at the Benedictine monastery of Niederaltaich, where he afterwards made his vows and was appointed custodian of the church. In this capacity he became thoroughly acquainted with the records of the monastery. Under Abbot Ditmar (1232–42) he was sent on important missions concerning the interests of the monastery, first to the emperor in Verona, then to the Roman Curia in 1239 and again in 1240. On 27 October 1242, he was elected Abbot of Niederaltaich. During his abbacy of thirty-one years the monastic discipline and the finances of the monastery were reportedly greatly improved. On 12 March 1273, he resigned his office on account of ill-health and old age, and spent the remaining two years of his life in retirement at his monastery.

Hermann is the author of a few historical works, of which the chief is the Annales Hermanni, reaching from 1137 to 1273. Up to 1146 they are based on previous chronicles; but from 1146 to 1173 they are the independent work of Hermann and are a useful historical source regarding Bavaria, Bohemia, and Austria. His other literary productions are:

- De rebus suis gestis, an account of the various architectural improvements made at Niederaltaich while he was abbot;
- De institutione monasterii Altahensis, a short narration of the foundation of Altach;
- De advocatis Altahensibus, a brief history of the Dukes of Bogen, patrons of Altach.

Hermann oversaw the copying of regnal lists at Niederaltaich and commissioned the production of the Catalogus ducum Bavariae, a list of Bavarian dukes, the original manuscript of which survives, including some of Hermann's own additions. The works of Hermann were published by Jaffé in Mon. Germ. Hist., XVII, 351- 427, German translation by Weiland in Geschichtschreiber der deutschen Vorzeit (Berlin, 1871; second edition, Leipzig, 1898).
