= David of Augsburg =

German mystic and Franciscan friar (13th century)

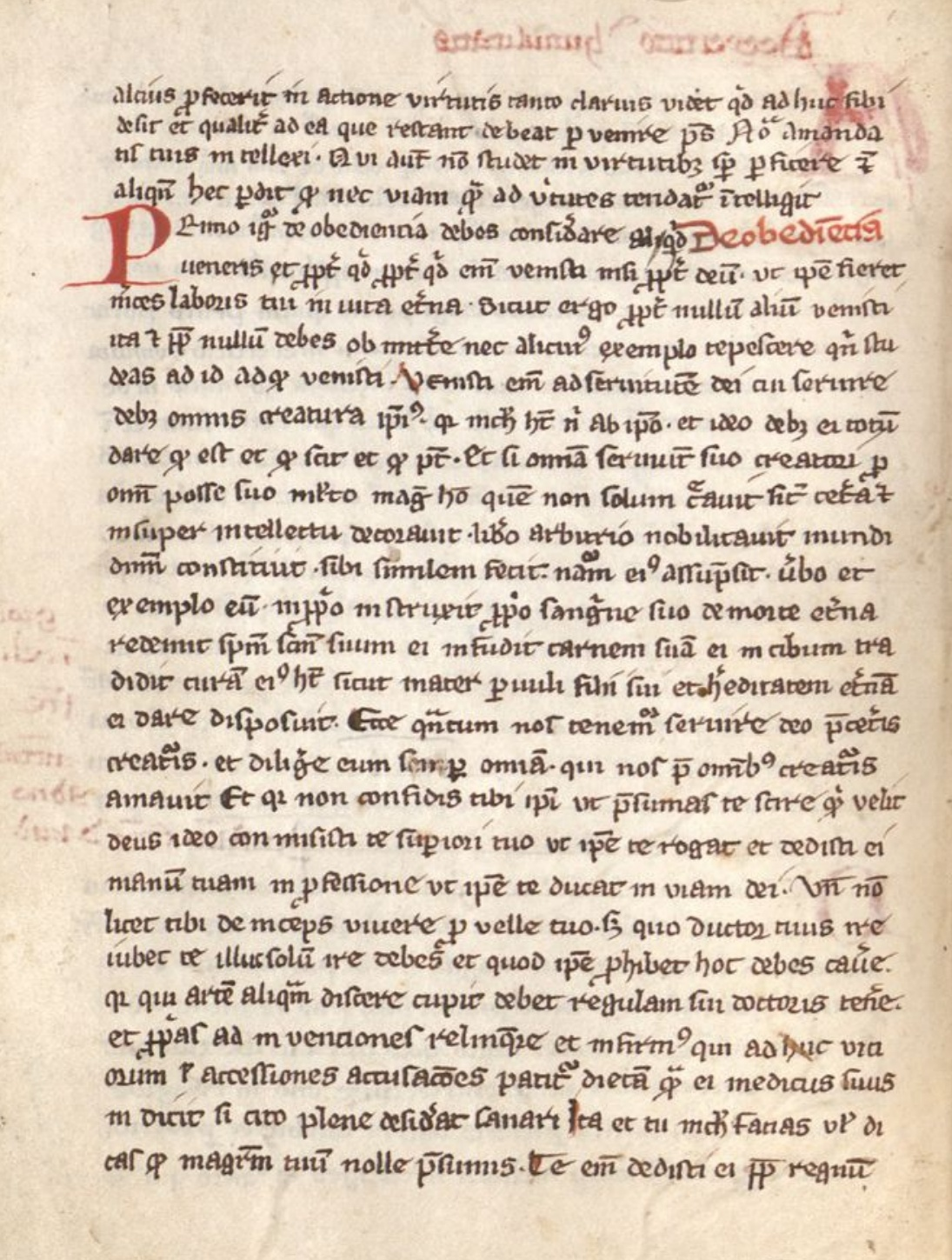
A page from a 14th-century manuscript copy of the Formula Novitiorum, the first part of The External and Internal Composition of Man by David of Augsburg (Bavarian State Library Clm 14098, f. 1v)

David of Augsburg (early 13th century – 19 November 1272) was a medieval German mystic, and a Franciscan friar. It is believed that he probably joined the Franciscan Order at Regensburg. He was the master of novices in the Franciscan houses at Regensburg and Augsburg. He wrote the acclaimed "Formula Novitiorum".

His major work, written in the 1240s, is entitled The Composition of the Interior and Exterior Man according to the Triple states of Beginners, Proficient, and Perfect. It is composed of three different treatises whose dates and relationships are difficult to determine. It was popular, since close to 400 manuscripts of the whole or parts survive, along with numerous translations.

He also composed various vernacular texts in Middle High German (24 are known, though at times doubt has been cast on the veracity of the attribution). The most notable of these are The Seven Stages of Prayer, and Concerning the Manifestation and Salvation of the Human Race.
