= List of South American dinosaurs =

This is a list of dinosaurs whose remains have been recovered from South America.

== Criteria for inclusion ==
- The genus must appear on the List of dinosaur genera.
- At least one named species of the creature must have been found in South America.

== List of South American dinosaurs ==
=== Valid genera ===
Name	Year	Formation	Location	Notes	Images
Abelisaurus	1985	Anacleto Formation (Late Cretaceous, Campanian)	Argentina	Only known from a single partial skull	
Achillesaurus	2007	Bajo de la Carpa Formation (Late Cretaceous, Santonian)	Argentina	Potentially a junior synonym of Alvarezsaurus	
Adamantisaurus	2006	Adamantina Formation (Late Cretaceous, Turonian to Maastrichtian)	Brazil	Derived from a titanosaur as indicated by the ball-and-socket articulations of its caudal vertebrae	
Adeopapposaurus	2009	Cañón del Colorado Formation (Early Jurassic, Hettangian to Pliensbachian)	Argentina	May have had a keratinous beak based on the shape of its jaw bones	
Aeolosaurus	1987	Allen Formation?, Angostura Colorada Formation, Lago Colhué Huapí Formation, Los Alamitos Formation?, Serra da Galga Formation? (Late Cretaceous, Campanian to Maastrichtian)	Argentina; Brazil?	Known from the remains of several individuals	
Aerosteon	2009	Anacleto Formation (Late Cretaceous, Campanian)	Argentina	Its bones were extensively pneumatized, suggesting an air sac system like those of modern birds	
Agustinia	1999	Lohan Cura Formation (Early Cretaceous, Aptian to Albian)	Argentina	Originally described as possessing long, vaguely stegosaur-like spikes, although these turned out to be fragments of ribs and other bones	
Alnashetri	2012	Candeleros Formation (Early Cretaceous, Albian)	Argentina	The oldest alvarezsauroid known from South America	
Alvarezsaurus	1991	Bajo de la Carpa Formation (Late Cretaceous, Santonian)	Argentina	One of the largest known alvarezsaurids	
Amargasaurus	1991	La Amarga Formation (Early Cretaceous, Barremian to Aptian)	Argentina	Possessed two parallel rows of backward-pointing spines on its neck that may have been covered by keratin sheaths or a skin sail	
Amargatitanis	2007	La Amarga Formation (Early Cretaceous, Barremian to Aptian)	Argentina	Originally described as a titanosaur although it has since been reinterpreted as a dicraeosaurid	
Amazonsaurus	2003	Itapecuru Formation (Early Cretaceous, Aptian to Albian)	Brazil	Had tall neural spines on its caudal vertebrae	
Amygdalodon	1947	Cerro Carnerero Formation (Early Jurassic, Toarcian)	Argentina	Its teeth were shaped like almonds	
Anabisetia	2002	Lisandro Formation (Late Cretaceous, Cenomanian to Turonian)	Argentina	Four specimens are known but the skull remains incompletely known	
Andesaurus	1991	Candeleros Formation (Early Cretaceous, Albian)	Argentina	Several osteological features indicate a basal position within the Titanosauria	
Aniksosaurus	2006	Bajo Barreal Formation (Late Cretaceous, Cenomanian to Turonian)	Argentina	Bone bed remains suggest a gregarious lifestyle	
Antarctosaurus	1929	Adamantina Formation?, Anacleto Formation, Plottier Formation? (Late Cretaceous, Coniacian? to Campanian)	Argentina; Brazil?	Multiple specimens have been assigned to this genus, including some from outside South America, but most may not represent the same taxon	
Anteavis	2025	Ischigualasto Formation (Late Triassic, Carnian)	Argentina	Has several neotheropod-like features despite not being a member of this clade	
Aoniraptor	2016	Huincul Formation (Early Cretaceous, Albian)	Argentina	Mostly recovered as a megaraptoran but a recent study recovers this genus as a relative of the enigmatic theropod Bahariasaurus	
Arackar	2021	Hornitos Formation (Late Cretaceous, Campanian to Maastrichtian)	Chile	The most complete sauropod known from Chile	
Aratasaurus	2020	Romualdo Formation (Early Cretaceous, Aptian)	Brazil	All three of its toes were symmetric	
Argentinosaurus	1993	Huincul Formation (Early Cretaceous, Albian)	Argentina	May be the largest known dinosaur	
Argyrosaurus	1893	Lago Colhué Huapí Formation (Late Cretaceous, Campanian to Maastrichtian)	Argentina	Several remains were historically assigned to this genus, but only the holotype can be confidently assigned to it	
Arrudatitan	2021	Adamantina Formation (Late Cretaceous, Campanian to Maastrichtian)	Brazil	Its tail probably curved strongly downwards, with the tip held very low to the ground	
Asfaltovenator	2019	Cañadón Asfalto Formation (Early Jurassic, Toarcian)	Argentina	Combines traits of both megalosauroids and allosauroids. Its describers suggest paraphyly of the former group	
Astigmasaura	2025	Huincul Formation (Early Cretaceous, Albian)	Argentina	Despite not being complete, the only known skeleton was fully articulated	
Atacamatitan	2011	Tolar Formation (Late Cretaceous, Cenomanian to Maastrichtian)	Chile	Only known from a single, fragmentary skeleton	
Aucasaurus	2002	Anacleto Formation (Late Cretaceous, Santonian to Campanian)	Argentina	Known from almost the entire skeleton, including most of the skull	
Austrocheirus	2010	Cerro Fortaleza Formation (Late Cretaceous, Campanian to Maastrichtian)	Argentina	Initially described as an abelisauroid but this has been disputed by subsequent research	
Austroposeidon	2016	Presidente Prudente Formation (Late Cretaceous, Campanian to Maastrichtian)	Brazil	The largest dinosaur known from Brazil	
Austroraptor	2008	Allen Formation (Late Cretaceous, Campanian to Maastrichtian)	Argentina	Possessed an elongated snout paralleling that of spinosaurids	
Baalsaurus	2018	Portezuelo Formation (Late Cretaceous, Turonian to Coniacian)	Argentina	Had a squared-off dentary with its teeth crowded to the front	
Bagualia	2020	Cañadón Asfalto Formation (Early Jurassic, Toarcian)	Argentina	Represents an early radiation of eusauropods that displaced earlier basal sauropodomorphs after a global warming event	
Bagualosaurus	2018	Santa Maria Formation (Late Triassic, Carnian)	Brazil	Its hindlimbs were very robust	
Bajadasaurus	2019	Bajada Colorada Formation (Early Cretaceous, Berriasian to Valanginian)	Argentina	Possessed elongated, forward-pointing spines erupting in pairs from the neck	
Barrosasaurus	2009	Anacleto Formation (Late Cretaceous, Campanian)	Argentina	Only known from three vertebrae but are well-preserved enough to warrant recognition as a distinct genus	
Baurutitan	2005	Serra da Galga Formation (Late Cretaceous, Maastrichtian)	Brazil	Originally described from an associated series of nineteen vertebrae. New remains were discovered later	
Berthasaura	2021	Goio-Erê Formation (Early Cretaceous, Aptian to Albian)	Brazil	Possessed a short, toothless beak, indicating a herbivorous or omnivorous diet	
Bicentenaria	2012	Candeleros Formation (Early Cretaceous, Albian)	Argentina	Several individuals were preserved together, suggesting a gregarious lifestyle	
Bicharracosaurus	2026	Cañadón Calcáreo Formation (Late Jurassic, Oxfordian to Kimmeridgian)	Argentina	The type and only known specimen was discovered by a farmer in 2001	
Bonapartenykus	2012	Allen Formation (Late Cretaceous, Campanian to Maastrichtian)	Argentina	Its holotype was preserved with two eggs that may have been within its oviducts when it died	
Bonapartesaurus	2017	Allen Formation (Late Cretaceous, Campanian to Maastrichtian)	Argentina	Belongs to the Austrokritosauria, a clade of hadrosaurids endemic to South America	
Bonatitan	2004	Allen Formation (Late Cretaceous, Campanian to Maastrichtian)	Argentina	Analysis of its inner ear suggests a decreased range of head movements compared to other sauropods	
Bonitasaura	2004	Bajo de la Carpa Formation (Late Cretaceous, Santonian)	Argentina	The proportions of its body were somewhat similar to those of diplodocoids, likely through convergent evolution	
Brachytrachelopan	2005	Cañadón Calcáreo Formation (Late Jurassic, Oxfordian to Tithonian)	Argentina	Possessed the shortest neck of any known sauropod	
Brasilotitan	2013	Adamantina Formation (Late Cretaceous, Maastrichtian)	Brazil	Had an L-shaped dentary similar to that of Antarctosaurus and Bonitasaura	
Bravasaurus	2020	Ciénaga del Río Huaco Formation (Late Cretaceous, Campanian to Maastrichtian)	Argentina	Discovered close to a large concentration of titanosaur eggs	
Buitreraptor	2005	Candeleros Formation (Early Cretaceous, Albian)	Argentina	May have been a pursuit predator due to its long legs	
Buriolestes	2016	Santa Maria Formation (Late Triassic, Carnian)	Brazil	Unlike all other sauropodomorphs, it was completely carnivorous, with serrated teeth to match	
Bustingorrytitan	2023	Huincul Formation (Early Cretaceous, Albian)	Argentina	Large yet distantly related to other gigantic titanosaurs	
Caieiria	2022	Serra da Galga Formation (Late Cretaceous, Maastrichtian)	Brazil	Its caudal vertebrae had an unusual anatomy	
Campananeyen	2024	Candeleros Formation (Early Cretaceous, Albian)	Argentina	Had a notably pneumatized ilium	
Campylodoniscus	1961	Bajo Barreal Formation (Late Cretaceous, Cenomanian)	Argentina	Only known from a single maxilla with seven teeth	
Carnotaurus	1985	La Colonia Formation (Late Cretaceous, Maastrichtian)	Argentina	Possessed a pair of short horns on the top of its skull	
Cathartesaura	2005	Huincul Formation (Early Cretaceous, Albian)	Argentina	Had a well-muscled neck although it could not move strongly up or down	
Chadititan	2025	Anacleto Formation (Late Cretaceous, Campanian)	Argentina	Represents a new fossil locality of the Anacleto Formation	
Chakisaurus	2024	Huincul Formation (Early Cretaceous, Albian)	Argentina	Known from various partial skeletons belonging to differently-aged individuals	
Chilesaurus	2015	Toqui Formation (Late Jurassic, Tithonian)	Chile	Combines traits of theropods, sauropodomorphs and ornithischians, with far-reaching implications for the evolution of the Dinosauria	
Choconsaurus	2017	Huincul Formation (Early Cretaceous, Albian)	Argentina	One of the most completely known basal titanosaurs	
Chromogisaurus	2010	Ischigualasto Formation (Late Triassic, Carnian)	Argentina	Its discovery suggests that early dinosaurs were more diverse than previously thought	
Chubutisaurus	1975	Cerro Barcino Formation (Late Cretaceous, Cenomanian)	Argentina	Unusually, its forelimbs were shorter than its hindlimbs	
Chucarosaurus	2023	Huincul Formation (Early Cretaceous, Albian)	Argentina	Smaller and more slender than the contemporary Argentinosaurus	
Cienciargentina	2025	Huincul Formation (Early Cretaceous, Albian)	Argentina	The fourth named rebbachisaurid from the Huincul Formation, suggesting a quick faunal turnover for this group	
Clasmodosaurus	1898	Cerro Fortaleza Formation, Mata Amarilla Formation (Late Cretaceous, Cenomanian to Maastrichtian)	Argentina	Similarly to Bonitasaura, its teeth were polygonal in cross-section	
Coloradisaurus	1990	Los Colorados Formation (Late Triassic, Norian)	Argentina	Originally called Coloradia, although that genus name is preoccupied by a moth	
Comahuesaurus	2012	Lohan Cura Formation (Early Cretaceous, Aptian to Albian)	Argentina	Its holotype was originally assigned to Limaysaurus, but it was named as a separate genus due to several morphological differences	
Condorraptor	2005	Cañadón Asfalto Formation (Early Jurassic, Toarcian)	Argentina	Closely related to the coeval Piatnitzkysaurus but could be distinguished by several osteological features	
Dasosaurus	2026	Itapecuru Formation (Early Cretaceous, Aptian)	Brazil	Closely related to Garumbatitan from Europe	
Diuqin	2024	Bajo de la Carpa Formation (Late Cretaceous, Santonian)	Argentina	Only known from a humerus and fragmentary vertebrae	
Dreadnoughtus	2014	Cerro Fortaleza Formation (Late Cretaceous, Campanian to Maastrichtian)	Argentina	The heaviest land animal whose mass can be calculated with reasonable certainty	
Drusilasaura	2011	Bajo Barreal Formation (Late Cretaceous, Cenomanian to Turonian)	Argentina	Potentially the oldest known member of the lognkosaurian lineage	
Ekrixinatosaurus	2004	Candeleros Formation (Early Cretaceous, Albian)	Argentina	Had robust bones, indicating a massive build and a greater resistance to injuries	
Elaltitan	2012	Bajo Barreal Formation (Late Cretaceous, Cenomanian to Turonian)	Argentina	Extremely large as indicated by its long femur	
Elemgasem	2022	Portezuelo Formation (Late Cretaceous, Turonian to Coniacian)	Argentina	The first abelisaurid known from the Turonian-Coniacian interval	
Emiliasaura	2025	Mulichinco Formation (Early Cretaceous, Valanginian)	Argentina	Initially described as a rhabdodontomorph, though a later study instead recovers it as a styracosternan	
Eoabelisaurus	2012	Cañadón Asfalto Formation (Early Jurassic, Toarcian)	Argentina	Shows a transitional arm morphology for an abelisauroid, with a shortened lower arm and hand, along with an unreduced humerus	
Eodromaeus	2011	Ischigualasto Formation (Late Triassic, Carnian)	Argentina	Well-adapted for cursoriality despite its early age	
Eoraptor	1993	Ischigualasto Formation (Late Triassic, Carnian)	Argentina	Possessed different types of teeth, suggesting it was omnivorous	
Epachthosaurus	1990	Bajo Barreal Formation (Late Cretaceous, Cenomanian to Turonian)	Argentina	Its caudal vertebrae were procoelous, meaning they were concave at the front and convex at the back	
Erythrovenator	2021	Candelária Formation (Late Triassic, Carnian to Norian)	Brazil	Known from the Riograndia Assemblage Zone, an area which is unusually dominated by cynodonts	
Futalognkosaurus	2007	Portezuelo Formation (Late Cretaceous, Coniacian)	Argentina	Possessed meter-deep cervical vertebrae with distinctive shark fin-shaped neural spines	
Gasparinisaura	1996	Anacleto Formation (Late Cretaceous, Campanian)	Argentina	Known from specimens of both adults and juveniles	
Genyodectes	1901	Cerro Barcino Formation (Early Cretaceous, Aptian to Albian)	Argentina	Had extremely large and protruding teeth	
Giganotosaurus	1995	Candeleros Formation (Early Cretaceous, Albian)	Argentina	One of the largest known terrestrial carnivorous dinosaurs	
Gnathovorax	2019	Santa Maria Formation (Late Triassic, Carnian)	Brazil	Known from a well-preserved, almost complete skeleton	
Gondwanatitan	1999	Adamantina Formation, Cambabe Formation? (Late Cretaceous, Maastrichtian)	Brazil	For a titanosaur, it had relatively gracile limb bones	
Gonkoken	2023	Dorotea Formation (Late Cretaceous, Maastrichtian)	Chile	The southernmost basal hadrosauroid known to date. Known from more southern latitudes than true hadrosaurids	
Guaibasaurus	1999	Caturrita Formation (Late Triassic, Norian)	Brazil	Combines features of both early theropods and sauropodomorphs	
Gualicho	2016	Huincul Formation (Early Cretaceous, Albian)	Argentina	Originally described as having highly reduced arms with only two fingers, convergent with tyrannosaurids, although one study suggests that a third finger was present	
Guemesia	2022	Los Blanquitos Formation (Late Cretaceous, Campanian)	Argentina	Unlike other abelisaurids, it lacked any ornamentation on its skull	
Herrerasaurus	1963	Ischigualasto Formation (Late Triassic, Carnian)	Argentina	One of the largest early carnivorous dinosaurs. Usually considered a basal saurischian but may be just outside the Dinosauria	
Huallasaurus	2022	Los Alamitos Formation (Late Cretaceous, Campanian to Maastrichtian)	Argentina	Remains originally misidentified as belonging to a southern species of Kritosaurus	
Huayracursor	2025	Santo Domingo Formation (Late Triassic, Carnian)	Argentina	Larger and longer-necked than more basal sauropodomorphs. Closely related to Bagualosaurus	
Huinculsaurus	2020	Huincul Formation (Early Cretaceous, Albian)	Argentina	The youngest known elaphrosaurine	
Ibirania	2022	São José do Rio Preto Formation (Late Cretaceous, Santonian to Campanian)	Brazil	May have attained its small size due to its arid inland habitat, unlike other dwarf titanosaurs which were affected by insular dwarfism	
Ilokelesia	1998	Huincul Formation (Early Cretaceous, Albian)	Argentina	Its skull retains some basal abelisauroid traits	
Inawentu	2024	Bajo de la Carpa Formation (Late Cretaceous, Santonian)	Argentina	Possessed a short neck and squared-off snout, convergent with the rebbachisaurids that went extinct shortly before this genus lived	
Ingentia	2018	Quebrada del Barro Formation (Late Triassic, Norian to Rhaetian)	Argentina	One of the earliest known very large sauropodomorphs	
Irritator	1996	Romualdo Formation (Early Cretaceous, Albian)	Brazil	May have been the apex predator of its habitat, hunting both aquatic and terrestrial prey	
Isaberrysaura	2017	Los Molles Formation (Middle Jurassic, Bajocian)	Argentina	Preserves gut contents including whole seeds	
Isasicursor	2019	Chorrillo Formation (Late Cretaceous, Maastrichtian)	Argentina	Four individuals of different ages were found together, suggesting it lived in herds	
Itapeuasaurus	2019	Alcântara Formation (Late Cretaceous, Cenomanian)	Brazil	The holotype is known from six vertebrae	
Jakapil	2022	Candeleros Formation (Early Cretaceous, Albian)	Argentina	May represent a novel lineage of ornithischians characterized by small size, deep jaws and a bipedal stance	
Joaquinraptor	2025	Lago Colhué Huapí Formation (Late Cretaceous, Maastrichtian)	Argentina	May have preyed upon crocodyliforms as suggested by the associated remains of one	
Kaijutitan	2019	Sierra Barrosa Formation (Late Cretaceous, Coniacian)	Argentina	One of the latest-surviving basal titanosaurs	
Kank	2026	Chorrillo Formation (Late Cretaceous, Maastrichtian)	Argentina	Its teeth share some features with Austroraptor and Buitreraptor	
Katepensaurus	2013	Bajo Barreal Formation (Late Cretaceous, Cenomanian to Turonian)	Argentina	Distinguished by a certain opening in its dorsal vertebrae	
Kelumapusaura	2022	Allen Formation (Late Cretaceous, Campanian to Maastrichtian)	Argentina	Known from the remains of various individuals	
Koleken	2024	La Colonia Formation (Late Cretaceous, Maastrichtian)	Argentina	Contemporary with its larger relative Carnotaurus	
Kurupi	2021	Marília Formation (Late Cretaceous, Maastrichtian)	Brazil	Would have had a stiff tail as indicated by the anatomy of its caudal vertebrae	
Lajasvenator	2020	Mulichinco Formation (Early Cretaceous, Valanginian)	Argentina	One of the smallest known allosauroids	
Lapampasaurus	2012	Allen Formation (Late Cretaceous, Campanian to Maastrichtian)	Argentina	Known from a partial skeleton lacking the skull	
Laplatasaurus	1929	Anacleto Formation (Late Cretaceous, Campanian)	Argentina	Osteoderms have been assigned to this taxon although this referral is uncertain	
Laquintasaura	2014	La Quinta Formation (Early Jurassic, Hettangian)	Venezuela	One study recovered it as a basal thyreophoran despite the fact no osteoderms have been found	
Lavocatisaurus	2018	Rayoso Formation (Early Cretaceous, Aptian to Albian)	Argentina	May have possessed a keratinous beak	
Leinkupal	2014	Bajada Colorada Formation (Early Cretaceous, Berriasian to Valanginian)	Argentina	The youngest known diplodocid	
Leonerasaurus	2011	Las Leoneras Formation (Early Jurassic, Sinemurian to Toarcian)	Argentina	Has an unusual combination of basal and derived traits	
Lessemsaurus	1999	Los Colorados Formation (Late Triassic, Norian)	Argentina	Grew very large despite lacking the anatomical traits usually seen as a support for gigantism	
Leyesaurus	2011	Quebrada del Barro Formation (Early Jurassic, Hettangian to Toarcian)	Argentina	Had an unusually small skull	
Ligabueino	1996	La Amarga Formation (Early Cretaceous, Barremian to Aptian)	Argentina	Known from a single, very small skeleton belonging to a juvenile animal	
Ligabuesaurus	2006	Lohan Cura Formation (Early Cretaceous, Aptian to Albian)	Argentina	Its forelimbs were extremely long, with similar proportions to those of brachiosaurids	
Limaysaurus	2004	Candeleros Formation, Huincul Formation (Early Cretaceous, Albian)	Argentina	Possessed elongated neural spines on its dorsal vertebrae	
Llukalkan	2021	Bajo de la Carpa Formation (Late Cretaceous, Santonian)	Argentina	May have had a keen sense of hearing due to the shape of its ear	
Loncosaurus	1899	Cardiel Formation, Metasiete Formation? (Late Cretaceous, Campanian to Maastrichtian)	Argentina	Poorly known	
Loricosaurus	1929	Allen Formation (Late Cretaceous, Maastrichtian)	Argentina	Potentially synonymous with Neuquensaurus or Saltasaurus	
Lucianovenator	2017	Quebrada del Barro Formation (Late Triassic, Norian to Rhaetian)	Argentina	One of the few theropods known from the Rhaetian	
Macrocollum	2018	Candelária Formation (Late Triassic, Norian)	Brazil	One of the oldest sauropodomorphs with an extremely elongated neck	
Macrogryphosaurus	2007	Sierra Barrosa Formation (Late Cretaceous, Coniacian)	Argentina	Preserves a series of mineralized plates along the side of the torso	
Mahuidacursor	2019	Bajo de la Carpa Formation (Late Cretaceous, Santonian)	Argentina	Its holotype was sexually mature but not fully grown	
Maip	2022	Chorrillo Formation (Late Cretaceous, Maastrichtian)	Argentina	The largest known megaraptoran	
Malarguesaurus	2008	Portezuelo Formation (Late Cretaceous, Turonian to Coniacian)	Argentina	Large and robustly built	
Manidens	2011	Cañadón Asfalto Formation (Early Jurassic, Toarcian)	Argentina	May have been arboreal due to the structure of its feet, with toes adapted for grasping	
Mapusaurus	2006	Huincul Formation (Early Cretaceous, Albian)	Argentina	At least seven specimens of different growth stages are known, possibly suggesting that this taxon lived and/or hunted in packs	
Maxakalisaurus	2006	Adamantina Formation (Late Cretaceous, Maastrichtian)	Brazil	Unusually for a sauropod, it had ridged teeth	
Megaraptor	1998	Portezuelo Formation (Late Cretaceous, Turonian to Coniacian)	Argentina	Possessed a large, strongly curved claw on its first finger	
Mendozasaurus	2003	Sierra Barrosa Formation (Late Cretaceous, Coniacian)	Argentina	Had spherical osteoderms that were probably located in rows along the flanks	
Menucocelsior	2022	Allen Formation (Late Cretaceous, Maastrichtian)	Argentina	Coexisted with multiple other titanosaurs that may have niche-partitioned	
Meraxes	2022	Huincul Formation (Early Cretaceous, Albian)	Argentina	Possessed reduced forelimbs convergent with several other groups of theropods	
Mesetasaurus	2026	Guichón Formation (Late Cretaceous, Coniacian to Maastrichtian)	Uruguay	Known from two well-preserved vertebrae	
Microcoelus	1893	Bajo de la Carpa Formation (Late Cretaceous, Santonian)	Argentina	May be a synonym of Neuquensaurus	
Mirischia	2004	Romualdo Formation (Early Cretaceous, Albian)	Brazil	Its holotype preserves an intestine	
Murusraptor	2016	Sierra Barrosa Formation (Late Cretaceous, Coniacian)	Argentina	Had a brain morphology similar to that of tyrannosaurids but its sensory capabilities were closer to the level of allosauroids	
Mussaurus	1979	Laguna Colorada Formation (Early Jurassic, Sinemurian)	Argentina	Multiple specimens from different growth stages are known. Juveniles may have been quadrupedal and shifted to bipedality as adults	
Muyelensaurus	2007	Plottier Formation (Late Cretaceous, Coniacian to Santonian)	Argentina	Relatively gracile for a titanosaur	
Narambuenatitan	2011	Anacleto Formation (Late Cretaceous, Campanian)	Argentina	Its neural spines are very similar to those of Epachthosaurus	
Neuquenraptor	2005	Portezuelo Formation (Late Cretaceous, Coniacian)	Argentina	Potentially synonymous with Unenlagia	
Neuquensaurus	1992	Anacleto Formation (Late Cretaceous, Campanian)	Argentina	One of the smallest known titanosaurs	
Nhandumirim	2019	Santa Maria Formation (Late Triassic, Carnian)	Brazil	Originally described as a theropod but has since been reinterpreted as a sauropodomorph	
Niebla	2020	Allen Formation (Late Cretaceous, Campanian to Maastrichtian)	Argentina	Had a uniquely built scapulocoracoid very similar to that of Carnotaurus	
Ninjatitan	2021	Bajada Colorada Formation (Early Cretaceous, Berriasian to Valanginian)	Argentina	The oldest known titanosaur	
Noasaurus	1980	Lecho Formation (Late Cretaceous, Campanian to Maastrichtian)	Argentina	Originally mistakenly believed to have possessed a dromaeosaurid-like sickle claw	
Nopcsaspondylus	2007	Candeleros Formation (Early Cretaceous, Albian)	Argentina	Named from a single, lost vertebra	
Notoceratops	1918	Lago Colhué Huapí Formation (Late Cretaceous, Campanian to Maastrichtian)	Argentina	Originally described as a ceratopsian but this identity is today doubted	
Notocolossus	2016	Plottier Formation (Late Cretaceous, Coniacian to Santonian)	Argentina	Unusually for a sauropod, its unguals were truncated	
Notohypsilophodon	1998	Bajo Barreal Formation (Late Cretaceous, Cenomanian to Turonian)	Argentina	Only known from a juvenile skeleton without the skull	
Nullotitan	2019	Chorrillo Formation (Late Cretaceous, Campanian to Maastrichtian)	Argentina	Would have niche-partitioned with smaller ornithopods	
Orkoraptor	2008	Cerro Fortaleza Formation (Late Cretaceous, Campanian)	Argentina	Had highly specialized dentition similar to that of coelurosaurs	
Overoraptor	2020	Huincul Formation (Early Cretaceous, Albian)	Argentina	Shows adaptations for both flight and cursoriality	
Overosaurus	2013	Bajo de la Carpa Formation (Late Cretaceous, Santonian)	Argentina	One of the smallest known aeolosaurins	
Padillasaurus	2015	Paja Formation (Early Cretaceous, Barremian)	Colombia	Originally described as a brachiosaurid although it could also be a somphospondylian	
Pampadromaeus	2011	Santa Maria Formation (Late Triassic, Carnian)	Brazil	Some features of its jaws are similar to those of theropods	
Pamparaptor	2011	Portezuelo Formation (Late Cretaceous, Turonian to Coniacian)	Argentina	Had a troodontid-like metatarsal	
Panamericansaurus	2010	Allen Formation (Late Cretaceous, Campanian to Maastrichtian)	Argentina	Known from a single partial skeleton	
Pandoravenator	2017	Cañadón Calcáreo Formation (Late Jurassic, Oxfordian to Tithonian)	Argentina	Inconsistent in phylogenetic placement	
Panphagia	2009	Ischigualasto Formation (Late Triassic, Carnian)	Argentina	Was omnivorous as indicated by its heterodont dentition	
Patagonykus	1996	Portezuelo Formation (Late Cretaceous, Turonian to Coniacian)	Argentina	Its discovery allowed researchers to connect Alvarezsaurus to parvicursorines	
Patagopelta	2022	Allen Formation (Late Cretaceous, Campanian to Maastrichtian)	Argentina	Although originally described as a nodosaurid, later analyses recover it as a parankylosaurian	
Patagosaurus	1979	Cañadón Asfalto Formation (Early Jurassic, Toarcian)	Argentina	Known from remains of adults and juveniles, depicting how various features developed in sauropods as they aged	
Patagotitan	2017	Cerro Barcino Formation (Early Cretaceous, Albian)	Argentina	One of the largest dinosaurs known from reasonably complete remains	
Pellegrinisaurus	1996	Allen Formation (Late Cretaceous, Campanian to Maastrichtian)	Argentina	May have lived inland unlike other contemporaneous titanosaurs	
Perijasaurus	2022	La Quinta Formation (Early Jurassic to Middle Jurassic, Toarcian to Aalenian)	Colombia	Only known from a single vertebra	
Petrobrasaurus	2011	Plottier Formation (Late Cretaceous, Coniacian to Santonian)	Argentina	Shares somes features with lognkosaurs, but its membership within this clade cannot be confirmed	
Piatnitzkysaurus	1979	Cañadón Asfalto Formation (Early Jurassic, Toarcian)	Argentina	One of the few early theropods with a well-preserved braincase	
Pilmatueia	2019	Mulichinco Formation (Early Cretaceous, Valanginian)	Argentina	Had elongated spines on its cervical vertebrae, although they were not as tall as those of Amargasaurus and Bajadasaurus	
Pitekunsaurus	2008	Anacleto Formation (Late Cretaceous, Campanian)	Argentina	Known from several bones from different parts of the body, including a braincase	
Powellvenator	2017	Los Colorados Formation (Late Triassic, Norian)	Argentina	Some of this genus' remains were originally associated with those of a pseudosuchian	
Puertasaurus	2005	Cerro Fortaleza Formation (Late Cretaceous, Campanian to Maastrichtian)	Argentina	Large but only known from very few remains	
Punatitan	2020	Ciénaga del Río Huaco Formation (Late Cretaceous, Campanian to Maastrichtian)	Argentina	Contemporary with Bravasaurus but was most likely distantly related	
Pycnonemosaurus	2002	Cachoeira do Bom Jardim Formation (Late Cretaceous, Campanian to Maastrichtian)	Brazil	Potentially the largest known abelisaurid	
Quetecsaurus	2014	Lisandro Formation (Late Cretaceous, Turonian)	Argentina	Its humerus has a unique shape	
Quilmesaurus	2001	Allen Formation (Late Cretaceous, Campanian to Maastrichtian)	Argentina	Had proportionally robust legs despite its small size	
Rayososaurus	1996	Candeleros Formation (Early Cretaceous, Albian)	Argentina	Very similar to Rebbachisaurus despite being only known from scant remains	
Rinconraptor	2026	Bajo de la Carpa Formation (Late Cretaceous, Santonian)	Argentina	Found alongside the remains of an indeterminate megaraptorid	
Rinconsaurus	2003	Bajo de la Carpa Formation (Late Cretaceous, Santonian)	Argentina	Unusually, its caudal vertebrae had a repeating pattern of procoely, amphicoely, opisthocoely and biconvex states	
Riojasaurus	1969	Los Colorados Formation (Late Triassic, Norian)	Argentina	Although commonly depicted as quadrupedal, the structure of its shoulder girdle suggests it may have potentially been bipedal	
Rocasaurus	2000	Allen Formation (Late Cretaceous, Campanian to Maastrichtian)	Argentina	Small for a sauropod yet was very robust	
Saltasaurus	1980	Lecho Formation (Late Cretaceous, Maastrichtian)	Argentina	Possessed osteoderms in the form of large round nodules connected by a mass of smaller plates	
Sanjuansaurus	2010	Ischigualasto Formation (Late Triassic, Carnian)	Argentina	Coexisted with Herrerasaurus but most likely represents a separate taxon	
Santanaraptor	1999	Romualdo Formation (Early Cretaceous, Aptian to Albian)	Brazil	Preserves soft tissues including the remains of skin, muscle and possibly blood vessels	
Sarmientosaurus	2016	Bajo Barreal Formation (Late Cretaceous, Cenomanian to Turonian)	Argentina	Analysis of its inner ear suggests it held its head downwards, possibly indicating a preference for low-growing plants	
Saturnalia	1999	Santa Maria Formation (Late Triassic, Carnian)	Brazil	Known from at least three partial skeletons	
Secernosaurus	1979	Lago Colhué Huapí Formation (Late Cretaceous, Maastrichtian)	Argentina	Would have lived in an arid gypsum desert	
Sektensaurus	2019	Lago Colhué Huapí Formation (Late Cretaceous, Campanian)	Argentina	The first non-hadrosaurid ornithopod recovered from central Patagonia	
Sidersaura	2024	Huincul Formation (Early Cretaceous, Albian)	Argentina	One of the largest known rebbachisaurids	
Skorpiovenator	2009	Huincul Formation (Early Cretaceous, Albian)	Argentina	Had an unusually short, deep skull	
Spectrovenator	2020	Quiricó Formation (Early Cretaceous, Barremian to Aptian)	Brazil	Its holotype was found underneath a sauropod skeleton	
Staurikosaurus	1970	Santa Maria Formation (Late Triassic, Carnian)	Brazil	May have been a rare component of its environment as only two specimens are known	
Stegouros	2021	Dorotea Formation (Late Cretaceous, Campanian to Maastrichtian)	Chile	Possessed a "macuahuitl" at the end of its tail, made of a connected "frond" of pointed osteoderms	
Tachiraptor	2014	La Quinta Formation (Early Jurassic, Hettangian)	Venezuela	Closely related to ceratosaurs and tetanurans	
Talenkauen	2004	Cerro Fortaleza Formation (Late Cretaceous, Campanian to Maastrichtian)	Argentina	May have practiced parental care as an adult and a hatchling have been found together	
Tapuiasaurus	2011	Quiricó Formation (Early Cretaceous, Aptian)	Brazil	One of the few titanosaurs from which a complete skull is known	
Taurovenator	2016	Huincul Formation (Early Cretaceous, Albian)	Argentina	Originally known from a single postorbital. Additional remains were described in 2024	
Tehuelchesaurus	1999	Cañadón Calcáreo Formation (Late Jurassic, Oxfordian to Tithonian)	Argentina	Preserves impressions of scaly skin	
Thanos	2020	São José do Rio Preto Formation (Late Cretaceous, Santonian)	Brazil	Only known from a single vertebra. The generic name honors the Marvel Comics villain Thanos	
Tiamat	2024	Açu Formation (Early Cretaceous to Late Cretaceous, Albian to Cenomanian)	Brazil	Named after a Mesopotamian goddess	
Tietasaura	2024	Marfim Formation (Early Cretaceous, Valanginian to Hauterivian)	Brazil	The first unambiguous ornithischian genus described from Brazil	
Titanomachya	2024	La Colonia Formation (Late Cretaceous, Maastrichtian)	Argentina	The morphology of its astragalus is intermediate between members of the Colossosauria and Saltasauroidea	
Tralkasaurus	2020	Huincul Formation (Early Cretaceous, Albian)	Argentina	Exhibits a conflicting blend of characteristics from basal and derived abelisauroids	
Tratayenia	2018	Bajo de la Carpa Formation (Late Cretaceous, Santonian)	Argentina	One of the youngest known megaraptorans	
Traukutitan	2011	Bajo de la Carpa Formation (Late Cretaceous, Santonian)	Argentina	Retained basal features in its caudal vertebrae despite its late age	
Trigonosaurus	2005	Serra da Galga Formation (Late Cretaceous, Maastrichtian)	Brazil	Potentially synonymous with Baurutitan	
Triunfosaurus	2017	Rio Piranhas Formation (Early Cretaceous, Berriasian to Valanginian)	Brazil	Originally described as a titanosaur but similarities have been noted with basal somphospondylians	
Tyrannotitan	2005	Cerro Barcino Formation (Early Cretaceous, Albian)	Argentina	Unlike other carcharodontosaurids, its sacral and caudal vertebrae were not pneumatic	
Uberabatitan	2008	Serra da Galga Formation (Late Cretaceous, Maastrichtian)	Brazil	Several individuals are known, some of which are very large	
Udelartitan	2024	Guichón Formation (Late Cretaceous, Cenomanian to Santonian)	Uruguay	Known from at least two fragmentary specimens	
Unaysaurus	2004	Caturrita Formation (Late Triassic, Carnian to Norian)	Brazil	Described as the first plateosaurid-grade sauropodomorph from Brazil	
Unenlagia	1997	Portezuelo Formation (Late Cretaceous, Coniacian)	Argentina	Could potentially be adapted for flapping due to the structure of its shoulder girdle	
Unquillosaurus	1979	Los Blanquitos Formation (Late Cretaceous, Maastrichtian)	Argentina	Has been suggested to be a dromaeosaurid or a carcharodontosaurid	
Velocisaurus	1991	Bajo de la Carpa Formation (Late Cretaceous, Santonian)	Argentina	Unusually, its third metatarsal is the thickest, which may be an adaptation to running	
Vespersaurus	2019	Rio Paraná Formation (Early Cretaceous to Late Cretaceous, Aptian to Campanian)	Brazil	Possessed raised claws on its second and fourth toes, making it functionally monodactyl, a possible adaptation to its desert habitat	
Viavenator	2016	Bajo de la Carpa Formation (Late Cretaceous, Santonian)	Argentina	May have relied on quick movements of its head and gaze stabilization when hunting	
Vitosaura	2025	Los Llanos Formation (Late Cretaceous, Campanian)	Argentina	One of the few Argentinian ceratosaurs discovered outside of Patagonia	
Volkheimeria	1979	Cañadón Asfalto Formation (Early Jurassic, Toarcian)	Argentina	Coexisted with at least four other eusauropods	
Willinakaqe	2010	Allen Formation (Late Cretaceous, Campanian to Maastrichtian)	Argentina	As originally described, it represented a chimera of two different taxa, one of which was later named Bonapartesaurus	
Xenotarsosaurus	1986	Bajo Barreal Formation (Late Cretaceous, Cenomanian to Turonian)	Argentina	Its astragalus and calcaneum had an unusual shape	
Yamanasaurus	2019	Río Playas Formation (Late Cretaceous, Campanian to Maastrichtian)	Ecuador	The northernmost saltasaurine known to date	
Yeneen	2026	Bajo de la Carpa Formation (Late Cretaceous, Santonian)	Argentina	Coexisted with several other titanosaurs	
Ypupiara	2021	Serra da Galga Formation (Late Cretaceous, Maastrichtian)	Brazil	May have been a piscivore due to the shape of its teeth	
Zapalasaurus	2006	La Amarga Formation (Early Cretaceous, Hauterivian to Aptian)	Argentina	Known from an incomplete skeleton, including several caudal vertebrae	
Zupaysaurus	2003	Los Colorados Formation (Late Triassic, Norian)	Argentina	Although commonly depicted with head crests, they may in fact be misplaced lacrimal bones	

=== Invalid and potentially valid genera ===
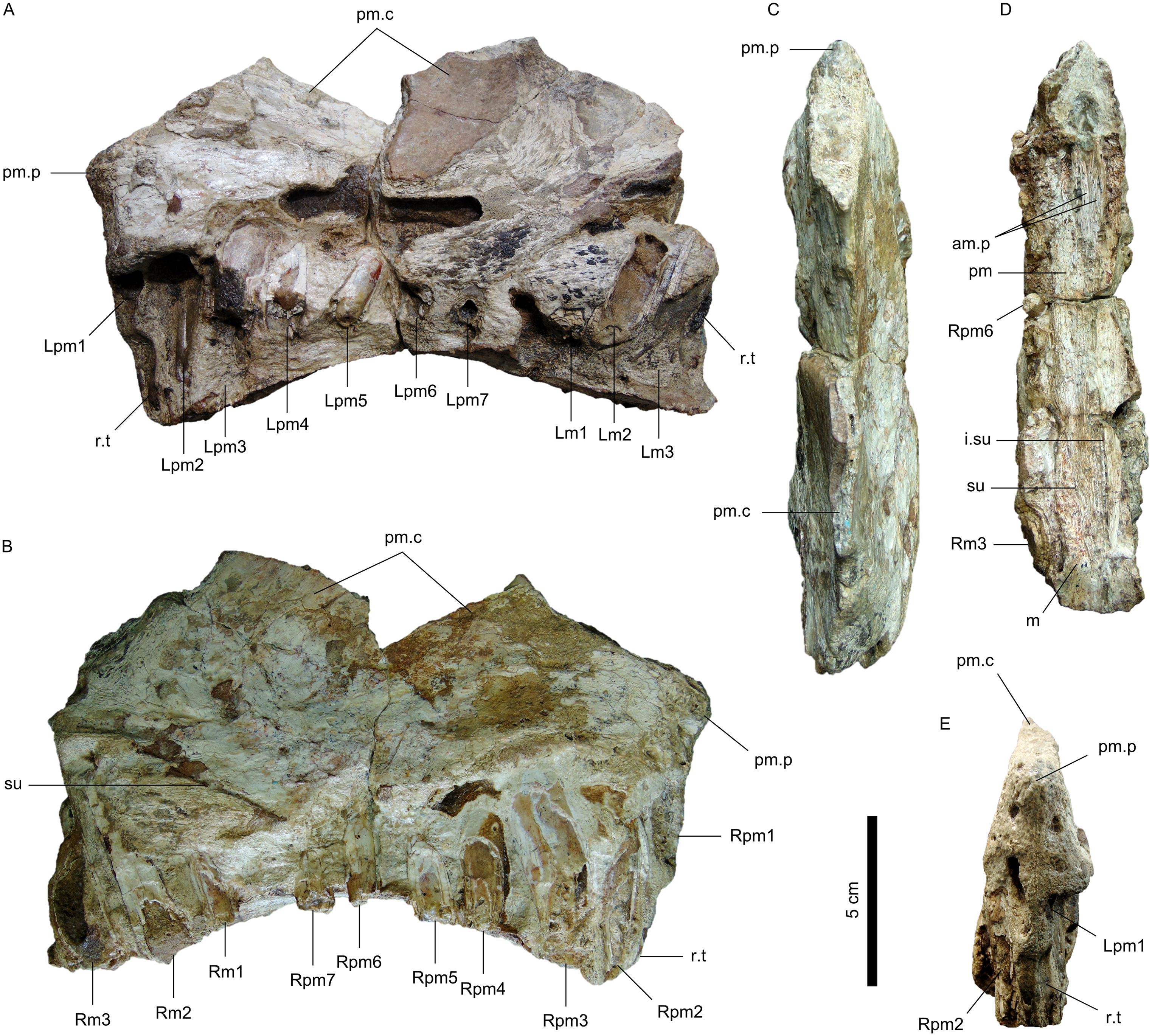
Angaturama

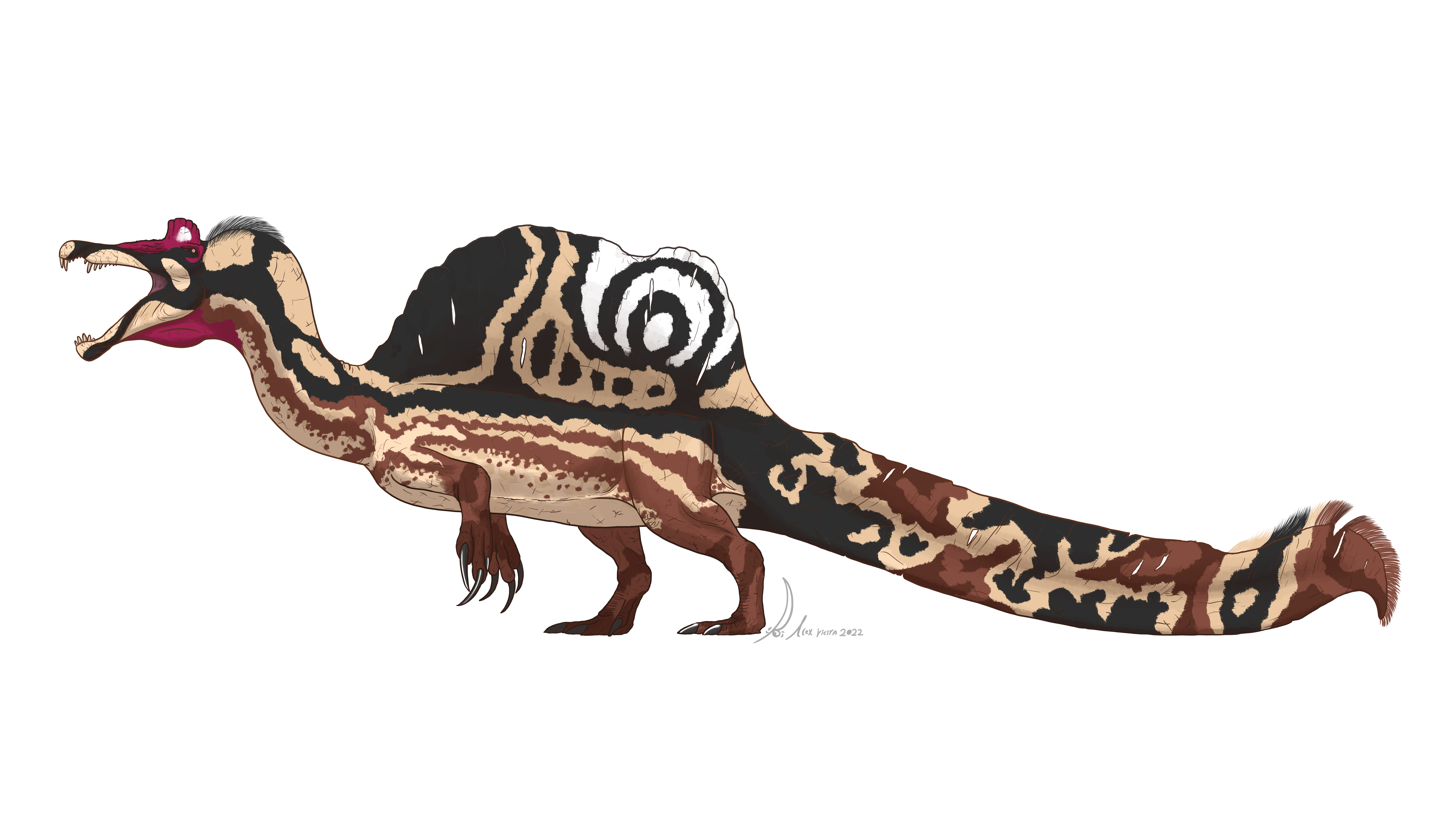
Oxalaia

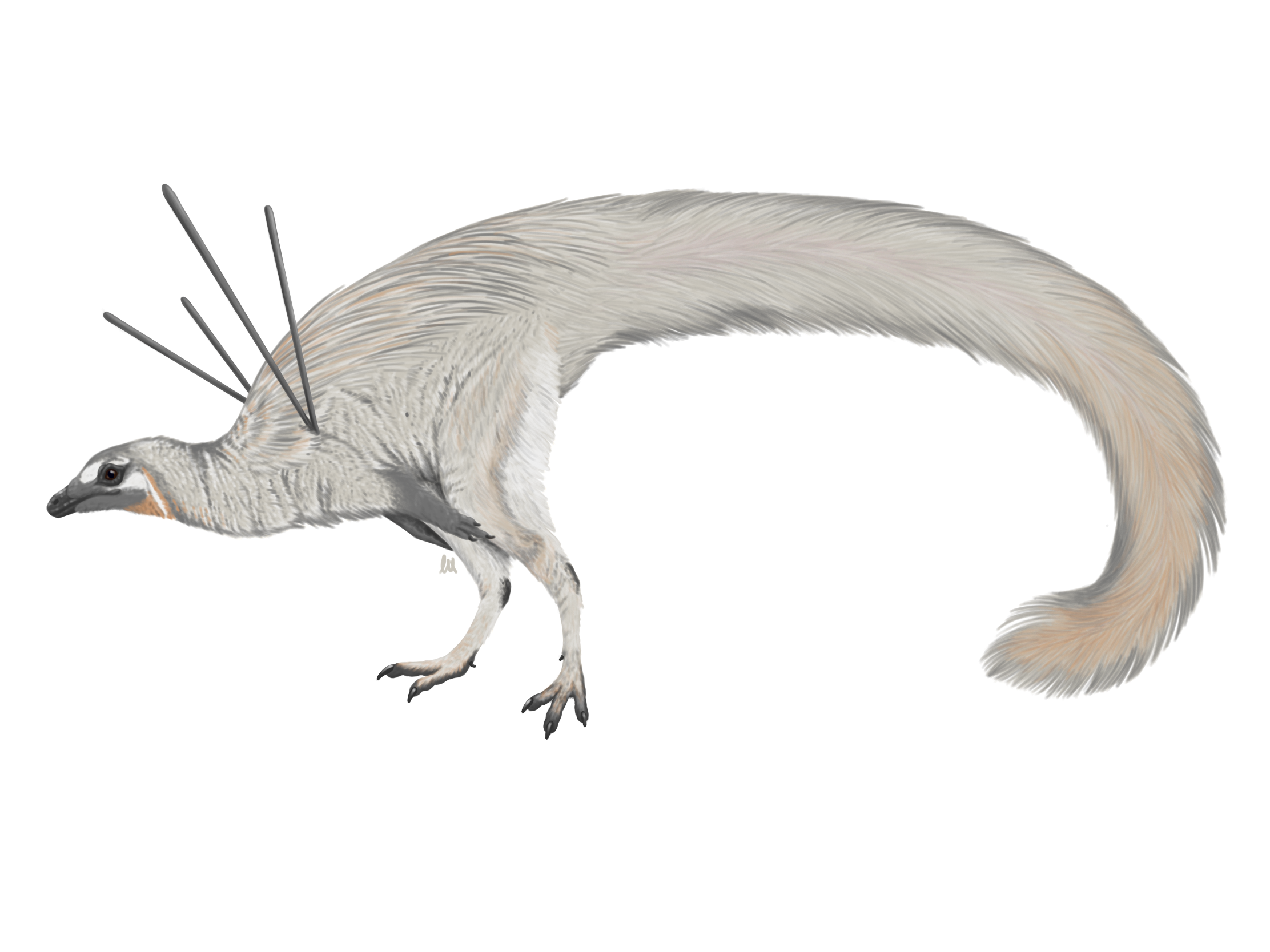
"Ubirajara"
- Angaturama limai: Only known from the tip of the snout. It may belong to the contemporary Irritator, but it could also represent its own taxon.
- "Bayosaurus pubica": An abelisaurid known from partial postcranial remains.
- Oxalaia quilombensis: Potentially a junior synonym of Spinosaurus.
- "Ubirajara jubatus": Known from a single specimen that preserves impressions of feathers, including display feathers on its sides. Its description was retracted before it could be published due to allegations that the specimen was illegally exported from Brazil.

== Timeline ==
This is a timeline of selected dinosaurs from the list above. Time is measured in Ma, megaannum, along the x-axis. Carnivores are shown in red, herbivores in green and omnivores in blue.

== See also ==
- List of birds of South America
