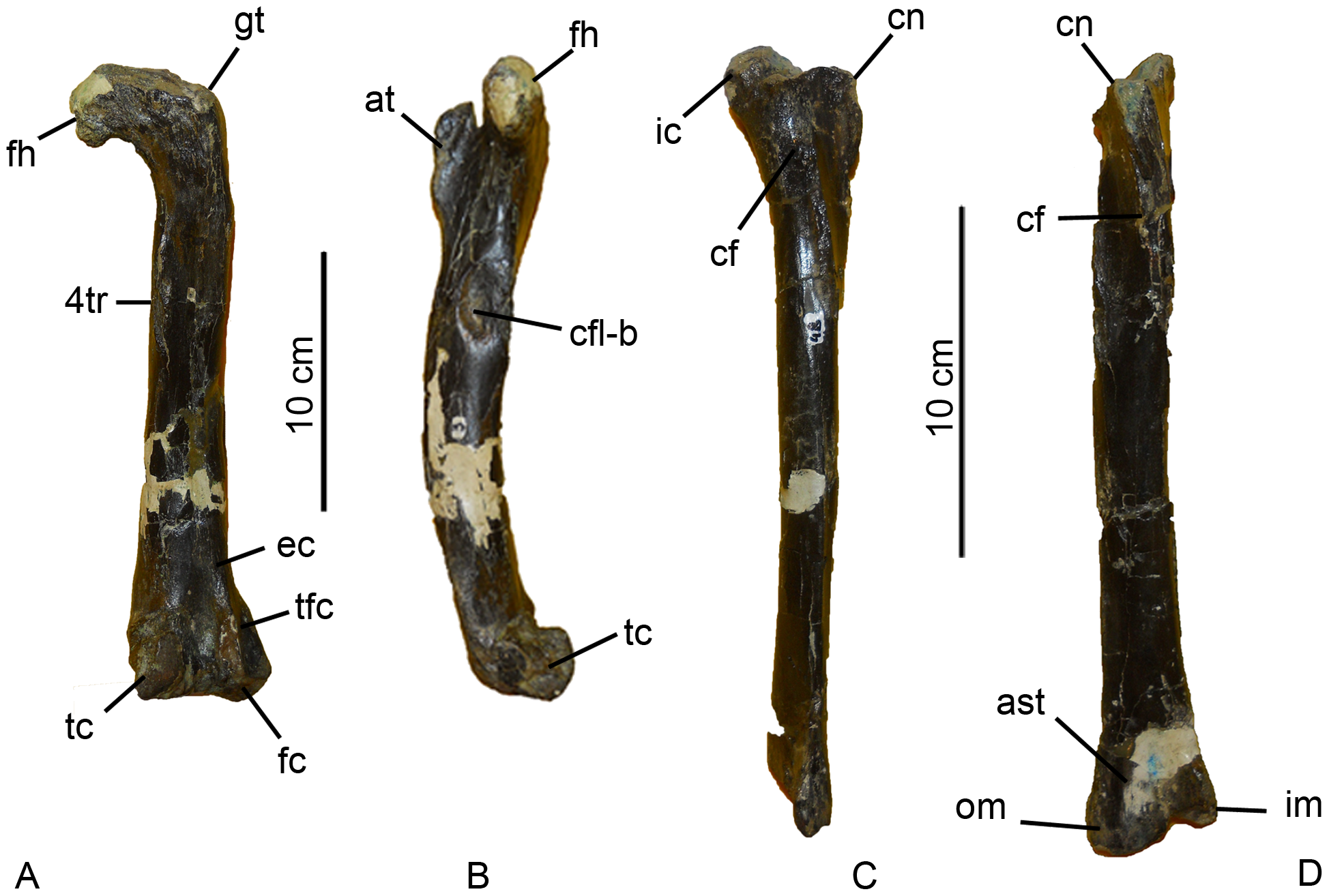
- Right femur (MDT-PV 1/3) and right tibia (MDT-PV 1/48)

Scientific classification
- Kingdom: Animalia
- Phylum: Chordata
- Clade: Dinosauria
- Clade: Saurischia
- Clade: Theropoda
- Genus: †Aniksosaurus
- Species: †A. darwini

Binomial name
- †Aniksosaurus darwini Martínez & Novas, 2006

= Aniksosaurus =

Aniksosaurus Temporal range: Late Cretaceous,96–91 Ma

Extinct species of reptile

Aniksosaurus (meaning "spring lizard", from Modern Greek Άνοιξη, "Spring", referring to the fact it was found on 21 September 1995, the onset of Spring on the Southern Hemisphere) is a genus of avetheropod dinosaur from what is now Chubut Province, Argentina. It lived during the Cenomanian to Turonian of the Cretaceous period, between 96-91 million years ago. The type species, Aniksosaurus darwini, was formally described from the Bajo Barreal Formation of the Golfo San Jorge Basin by Rubén Dario Martínez and Fernando Emilio Novas in 2006; the name was coined in 1995 and reported in the literature in 1997. The specific epithet honors Charles Darwin who visited Patagonia in 1832/1833 during the Voyage of the Beagle.

== Description ==
The type specimen MDT-PV 1/48, discovered in the Bajo Barreal Formation, consists of an articulated right hindlimb, which includes the femur, fibula, tibia and foot. The longest femur discovered for this genus measures 247mm, and the longest tibia, 270mm. On average, the tibia is 13% longer than the femur in Aniksosaurus, an adaptation which has been strongly correlated with the development of cursorial habits in dinosaurs. Martinez and Novas (2006), based on femoral measurements, originally suggested that Aniksosaurus darwini was approximately 2 m (7 ft) long and 70 cm (2 ft) tall at the hip, and weighed up to 65 kilograms (143 pounds). However, recent estimates suggest a total body length between 2 m (7 ft) and 3 m (10 ft) and a body weight between 35 kilograms (77 pounds) and 45 kilograms (99 pounds). In a 2013 study by Ibiricu et al., it was concluded that the holotype and four more individuals referable to Aniksosaurus, were juvenile to sub-adult individuals as shown by a histological analysis. The two individuals analyzed had histological characteristics that suggested an approximate age of three. The morphological evidence supporting ontogenetic immaturity was as follows: (a) the absence of an outer circumferential layer; (b) the absence of secondary (Haversian) osteons; (c) the presence of only a few growth cycles; and (d) the thickness of the zones.

== Classification ==
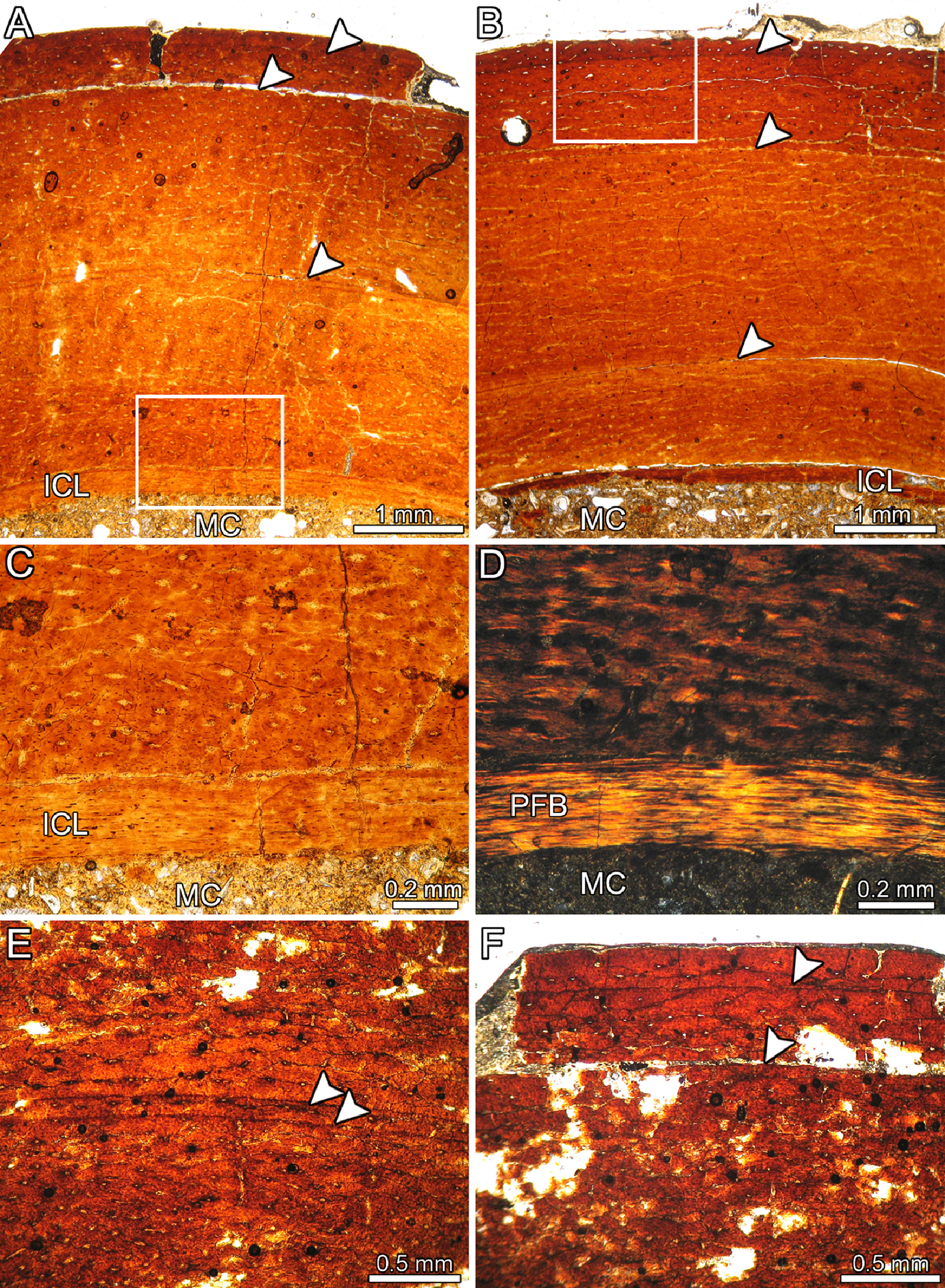
Histology of Aniksosaurus tibiae

Martínez and Novas (2006) originally assigned this genus to the clade Coelurosauria based on anatomical features present in the hindlimbs. The paleontologists describe Aniksosaurus as "more derived than some basal coelurosaurians such as compsognathids, Ornitholestes, and coelurids", but less advanced than later coelurosaurs such as Tyrannosaurus and Oviraptor. Aniksosaurus exhibits some of the derived features found in Coelurosauria, such as (a) the ilium has a well developed cuppedicus fossa; (b) the femur possesses an anterior trochanter that is proximally projected, almost reaching the level of the articular head; (c) the greater trochanter is craniocaudally expanded; (d) the femoral head is rectangular-shaped in cranial aspect; (e) and the fibular shaft is craniocaudally narrow. Choiniere et al. (2010) demonstrated that phylogenetically, Aniksosaurus was closer to individuals in the taxon Compsognathidae. Hartman et al. (2019) instead find it to be a maniraptoromorph outside compsognathids and maniraptorans, while Naish and Cau (2022) find it to be a megaraptoran.

=== Distinguishing anatomical features ===
A diagnosis is a statement of the anatomical features of an organism (or group) that collectively distinguish it from all other organisms. Some, but not all, of the features in a diagnosis are also autapomorphies. An autapomorphy is a distinctive anatomical feature that is unique to a given organism.

According to Martínez and Novas (2006), Aniksosaurus can be distinguished based on the following characteristics:

- cranial cervical vertebrae have dorsoventrally deep neural arches, and are provided with a pair of cavities at their cranial surfaces
- the neural canal is wide
- cranial caudals feature a ventral sagittal keel, and their transverse processes are triangular-shaped in dorsal view
- manual ungual phalanges are robust
- the metatarsal and digit IV of the pes are transversely narrow
- ilium with an extremely expanded brevis shelf (a bone surface on the ilium that functions as an attachment site for tail muscles)
- the femur possesses a deep notch for the M. iliotrochantericus

== Paleobiology ==
Monospecific bonebeds suggest it was gregarious, and that this behavior gave Aniksosaurus a selective advantage over competitors in its paleoenvironment. The hypothesis suggesting gregarious (social) behavior is supported by the taphonomic association of individuals from the Bajo Barreal Formation and evidence garnered from analysis of its bone histology. The authors of this study, Ibiricu, Martínez, Casal and Cerda (2013) noted that this particular assemblage is only the second known body fossil association of small, coelurosaurian theropods discovered in South America. The theropod taxa that have been interpreted as gregarious are Coelophysis bauri, Syntarsus rhodiensensis, Albertosaurus sarcophagus and Sinornithomimus dongi. Aniksosaurus is likely to have exhibited gregariousness only during a specific interval of its life, most likely when it was a sub-adult.

== Paleoecology ==
=== Provenance and occurrence ===
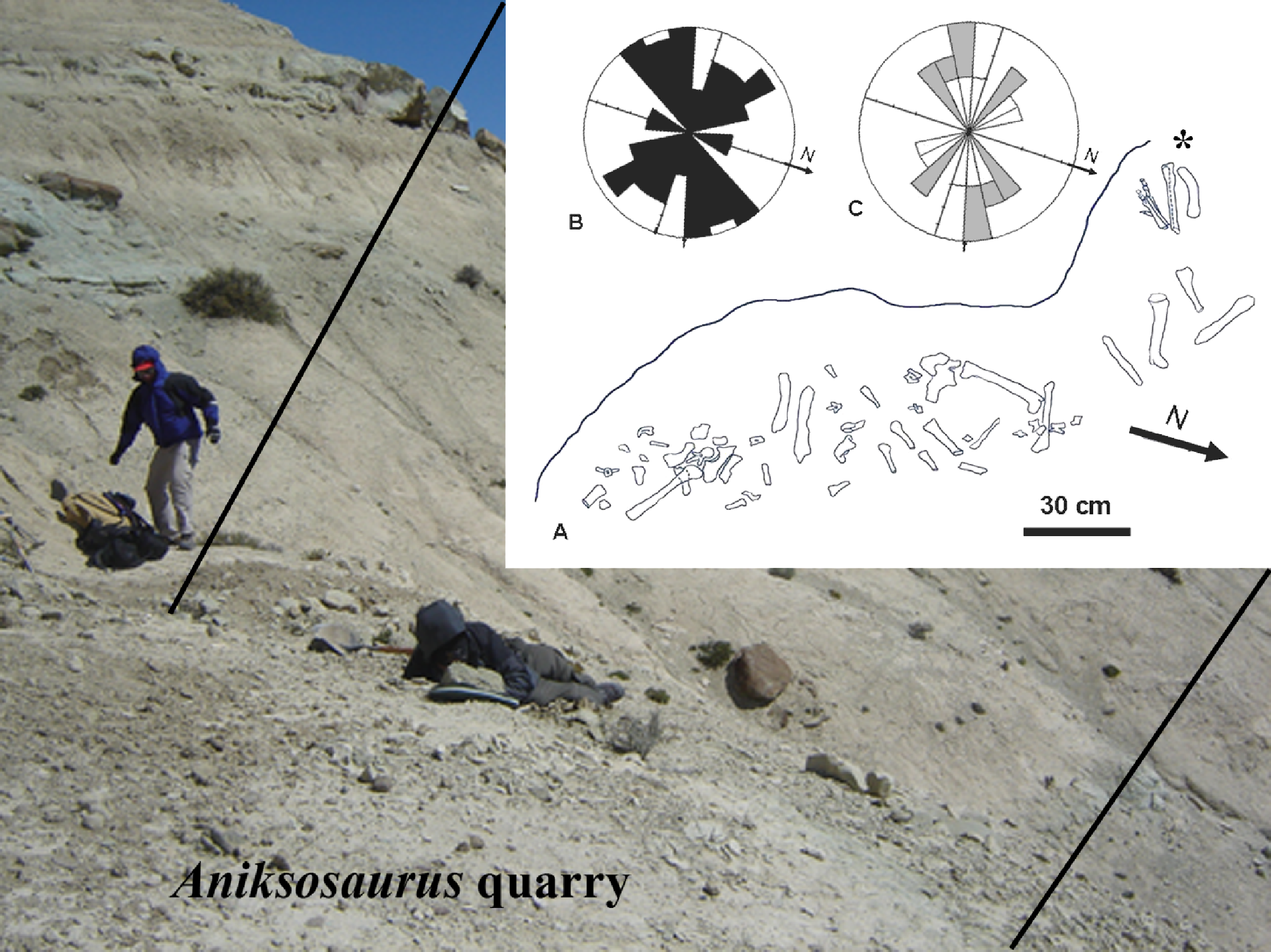
Quarry map of the Bajo Barreal site

The remains of the type specimen MDT-PV 1/48 were discovered in the Laguna Palacios Ranch locality in the lower Bajo Barreal Formation of Patagonia in Chubut, Argentina. The specimen was collected by Martínez in 1995 in green sandstone that was deposited between the Cenomanian stage and the Turonian stage of the Cretaceous period, between 96-91 million years ago, as shown by radiometric Ar-Ar dating. This specimen is housed in the collection of the Museo Regional Desiderio Torres - in Sarmiento, Chubut, Argentina. Remains of at least four more individuals, in 2006 assigned as the paratypes, were uncovered at the site.

=== Fauna and habitat ===
Dinosaur remains from this formation include those of the abelisaurid theropod Xenotarsosaurus bonapartei, the sauropods Drusilasaura, Epachthosaurus and Campylodoniscus, the hadrosaur Secernosaurus as well as indeterminate teeth belonging to carcharodontosaurids and dromaeosaurids.

== Taphonomy ==
The nature of the lithology at the Aniksosaurus site suggests that the deposits were made by a low-energy, unidirectional, overbank fluvial floodplain deposit, which was produced by a lateral migrating fluvial channel. The observation that sandstone tabular bodies were deposited with coarse sandstones and tuff interclasts also supports that Aniksosaurus was preserved in a fluvial environment. The soft tissue underwent subaerial weathering and then began to decompose, from the contributory action of small vertebrae scavengers as evidenced by a series of small grooves in one of the femora recovered, which was then followed by the partial disarticulation of the skeleton. Disarticulation was followed by reorientation of the remains by fluvial currents, which was then followed by differential burial in what appears to have been at least two stages of sedimentation. No evidence was found to support either cannibalism or intra-specific competition.
