= Lago Colhué Huapí Formation =

Geologic formation in Argentina

- Stratigraphic range: Campanian-Maastrichtian; ~80–66 Ma
- Type: Geological formation
- Unit of: Chubut Group
- Underlies: Laguna Palacios Formation and Río Chico Group (Salamanca Formation)
- Overlies: Bajo Barreal Formation

Lithology
- Primary: Tuff
- Other: Sandstone

Location
- Coordinates: 45.6°S 68.5°W
- Approximate paleocoordinates: 48.2°S 55.2°W
- Region: Central Patagonia
- Country: Argentina
- Extent: Golfo San Jorge Basin

Type section
- Named for: Lake Colhué Huapí
- Lago Colhué Huapí Formation (Argentina)

The Lago Colhué Huapí Formation is a Late Cretaceous geologic formation of the Chubut Group in the Golfo San Jorge Basin in Patagonia, Argentina. The formation, named after Lake Colhué Huapí, is overlain by the Salamanca Formation of the Río Chico Group and in some areas by the Laguna Palacios Formation.

The strata of the Lago Colhué Huapé Formation were thought to pertain to the Bajo Barreal Formation, but are now recognized as a distinct stratigraphic unit in their own right. The upper part of the Lago Colhué Huapí Formation has been dated to the upper Maastrichtian age of the late Cretaceous period. A basalt flow in the formation has been dated to 67.31 ± 0.55 million years ago, reinforcing the Late Maastrichtian age.

== Vertebrate paleofauna ==
Taxa recovered from the Lago Colhué Huapí Formation include the sauropods Aeolosaurus, and Argyrosaurus, as well as the hadrosaurid Secernosaurus and the probable elasmarian ornithopod Sektensaurus. The dubious ornithischian Notoceratops was also present.

=== Dinosaurs ===
Color key: Taxon / Reclassified taxon / Taxon falsely reported as present / Dubious taxon or junior synonym / Ichnotaxon / Ootaxon / Morphotaxon	Notes; Uncertain or tentative taxa are in small text; ~~crossed out~~ taxa are discredited.

==== Ornithischians ====
Ornithopods from the Lago Colhué Huapí Formation
Genus	Species	Locality	Stratigraphic position	Material	Notes	Images
Notoceratops	N. bonarellii		Upper	An incomplete, toothless left dentary	A dubious genasaurian ornithischian	Secernosaurus
Secernosaurus	S. koerneri	Rio Chico	Upper	A partial skeleton	A saurolophine hadrosaur	Secernosaurus
Sektensaurus	S. sanjuanboscoi	An ephemeral island	Upper	An associated partial skeleton	An elasmarian ornithopod	Secernosaurus

==== Sauropods ====
Sauropods from the Lago Colhué Huapí Formation
Genus	Species	Locality	Stratigraphic position	Material	Notes	Images
Aeolosaurus	A. colhuehuapensis	An ephemeral island	Upper	A partial skeleton	A titanosaur	Aeolosaurus Argyrosaurus
Argyrosaurus	A. superbus	La Angostura, Río Chico.	Upper	A set of limb elements (left forelimb)	A titanosaur	Aeolosaurus Argyrosaurus
Elaltitan	E. lilloi	Río Senguerr bend	Lower	A partial skeleton	A titanosaur	Aeolosaurus Argyrosaurus
Lithostrotia indet.	Indeterminate		Middle	A partial skeleton	A titanosaur	Aeolosaurus Argyrosaurus

==== Theropods ====
Theropods from the Lago Colhué Huapí Formation
Genus	Species	Locality	Stratigraphic position	Material	Notes	Images
Joaquinraptor	J. casali	Valle Joaquín	Upper	A partial skeleton including skull bones, vertebrae, the pectoral girdle, and forelimb and hindlimb bones	A megaraptorid theropod	Joaquinraptor
Theropoda indet.	Indeterminate	An ephemeral island, Mocha Peninsula	Upper	A manual ungual (hand claw) and possible metatarsal III	A possible megaraptoran theropod	Joaquinraptor

=== Other reptiles ===
Reptiles from the Lago Colhué Huapí Formation
Genus	Species	Locality	Stratigraphic position	Material	Notes	Images
Colhuehuapisuchus	C. lunai	An ephemeral island	Upper.	A mandible (Anterior portion of mandibles)	A peirosaurid notosuchian	

=== Fish ===
Fishes from the Lago Colhué Huapí Formation
Genus	Species	Locality	Stratigraphic position	Material	Notes	Images
Metaceratodus	M. kaopen		Upper		A ceratodontid lungfish	

=== Plants ===
Plants of the Lago Colhué Huapí Formation
Genus	Species	Location	Stratigraphic position	Material	Notes	Images
Azolla	A. colhuehuapensis				An aquatic fern	
Spinizonocolpites	S. riochiquensis				A palm tree	

== See also ==
- List of dinosaur-bearing rock formations
- List of stratigraphic units with few dinosaur genera
