= Sektensaurus =

Sektensaurus Temporal range: Maastrichtian ~68–66 Ma

Scientific classification
- Kingdom: Animalia
- Phylum: Chordata
- Class: Reptilia
- Clade: Dinosauria
- Clade: †Ornithischia
- Clade: †Ornithopoda
- Clade: †Elasmaria
- Genus: †Sektensaurus; Ibiricu et al. 2019

Type species
- Sektensaurus sanjuanboscoi Ibiricu et al. 2019

Extinct genus of dinosaurs

Sektensaurus (meaning "island lizard", sekten meaning "island" in Tehuelche) is a genus of ornithopod dinosaur, possibly an elasmarian, from the Late Cretaceous (Maastrichtian) of Patagonia, Argentina. Its remains were uncovered in the fluvial tuffs of the Lago Colhué Huapí Formation in the Golfo San Jorge Basin. The type and only species is S. sanjuanboscoi. Sektensaurus is the first non-hadrosauroid ornithopod of central Patagonia. The discovery of the genus increases the anatomical knowledge of ornithopods and adds new data on the compositions of dinosaur faunas that lived in Patagonia close to Antarctica at the end of the Cretaceous.

== History of discovery ==
Fossils from the Late Cretaceous of central Patagonia have been found since the 1910s in the area around Lago Colhué Huapi on and around islands that emerge during periods of low lake level. On one such ephemeral island in 1993 Argentine palaeontologist Marcello Luna discovered and collected a partial associated skeleton of a small non-hadrosaurid ornithopod, the first from the region. In 2010 Luna, as well as Argentine palaeontologists Lucio Ibiricu and colleagues described the 1993 collection, UNPSJB-PV 960, multiple postcranial elements, as a single individual from the Bajo Barreal Formation of Campanian to possibly Maastrichtian age. The assessment as a single individual was supported by the adult nature of all the remains, their association within only a 3 m (9.8 ft) area, and the lack of any other fossils around the site. While Ibiricu and colleagues did not name the specimen, they did find that it was possibly close to but distinct from other ornithopods from Gondwana.

In 2017, Lago Colhué Huapi receded, allowing researchers to revisit the original site of UNPSJB-PV 960. Riding motorbikes and all-terrain vehicles to reach the island, more fossils were collected which were interpreted as additional remains of the same individual. From this revisit, the sediments were also reidentified as those of the Coniacian to Maastrichtian age Lago Colhué Huapi Formation, with new collections bearing the number UNPSJB-PV 1054 while previous material included UNPSJB-PV 960 and UNPSJB-PV 973. It was interpreted that wave action and lake level instability gradually eroded out the fossils but did not have enough energy to disperse them far beyond their original location. Ibiricu, Luna and colleagues described the new and all previous material in 2019, with UNPSJB-PV 1054 as the holotype of the new taxon Sektensaurus sanjuanboscoi. The genus name is derived from the Tehuelche indigenous term "sekten" for "island" and Ancient Greek σαῦρος (saurus), "lizard", while the species name honours Universidad Nacional de la Patagonia San Juan Bosco where most of the palaeontologist either studied or worked as researchers. Prepress versions of the 2019 description included the identification of a frontal bone of the skull that Australian palaeontologist Stephen Poropat reidentified as a turtle plastron, though this was removed by final publication. Otherwise, Sektensaurus was only known from numerous complete or incomplete bones of the skeleton, including vertebrae, limb bones, and parts of the pelvis. Poropat reinterpreted some of the bones of Sektensaurus, finding the left tibia and right radius were instead the metatarsal and ischium respectively, and the right humerus and fibula were both from the left side of the animal.

== See also ==
- South Polar region of the Cretaceous
