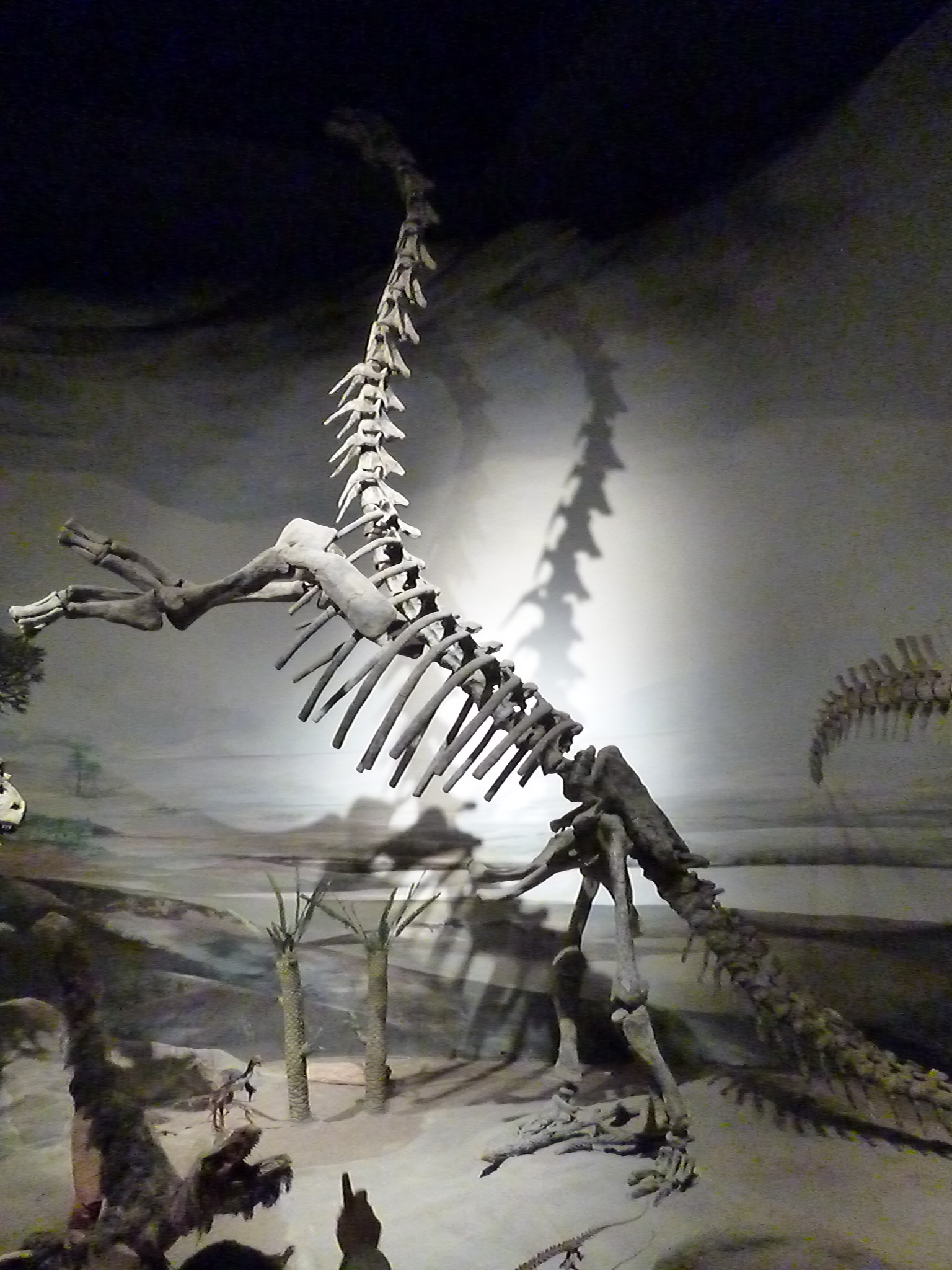
- Cast mounted in rearing pose, Museo Egidio Feruglio

Scientific classification
- Kingdom: Animalia
- Phylum: Chordata
- Class: Reptilia
- Clade: Dinosauria
- Clade: Saurischia
- Clade: †Sauropodomorpha
- Clade: †Sauropoda
- Clade: †Macronaria
- Clade: †Titanosauria
- Genus: †Epachthosaurus; Powell, 1990

Type species
- †Epachthosaurus sciuttoi Powell, 1990

= Epachthosaurus =

Epachthosaurus Temporal range: Late Cretaceous, 95–90 Ma

Extinct genus of dinosaurs

Epachthosaurus (meaning "heavy lizard") was a genus of titanosaurian sauropod dinosaur, belonging to Lithostrotia, from the Late Cretaceous of Central and Northern Patagonia in South America.

== Discovery and naming ==
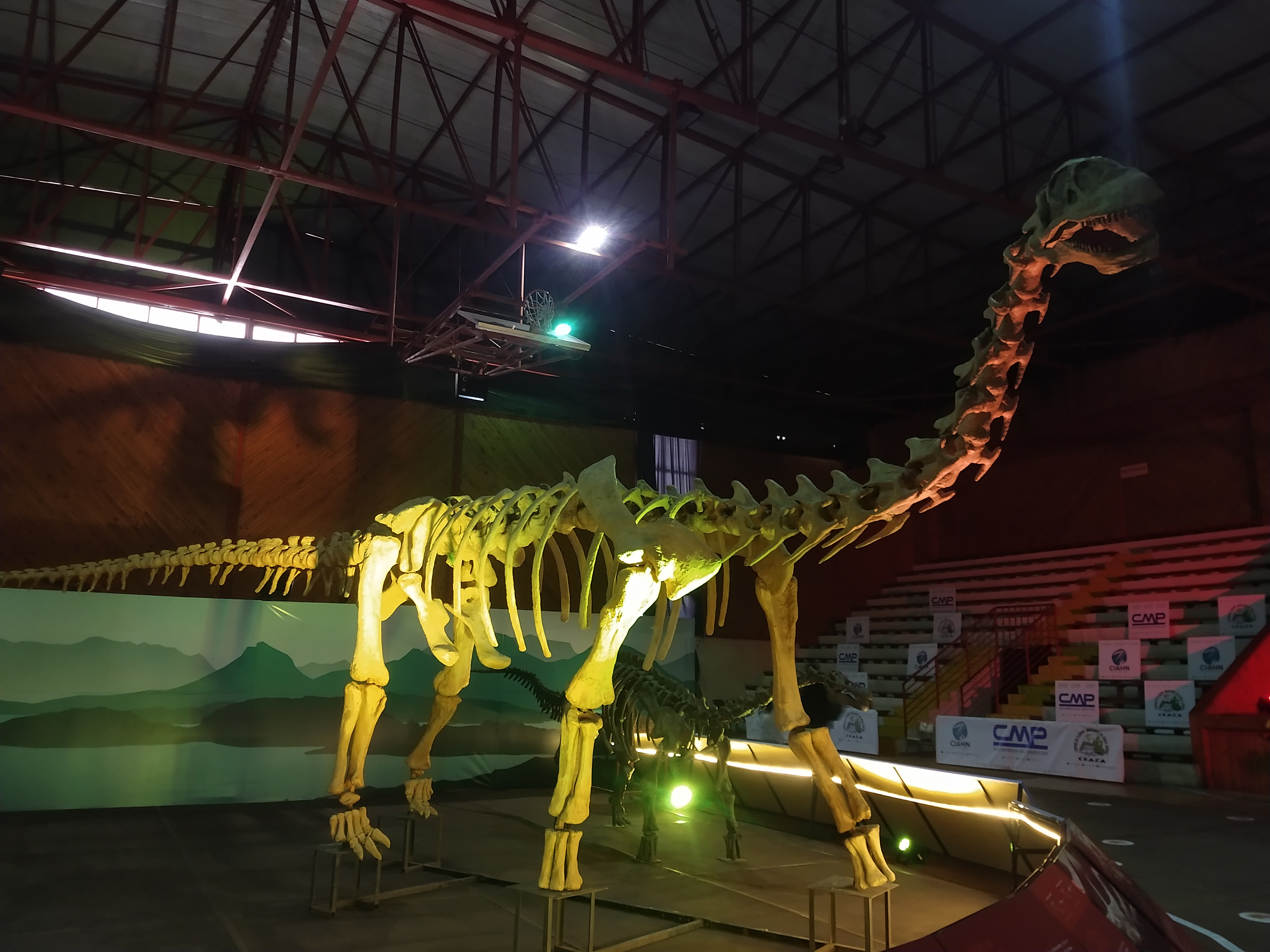
Skeleton cast, Coquimbo

The type species, E. sciuttoi, was described by Powell in 1990. The bones assigned to it by Powell in 1990 were, originally, assigned to Antarctosaurus sp., and then to Argyrosaurus superbus?, before being named as a new taxon.

The holotype specimen is MACN-CH 1317, which consists of an incomplete posterior dorsal vertebra. Another specimen, the paratype MACN-CH 18689, consists of a cast of six articulated caudal vertebrae, the partial sacrum, and a fragmentary pubic peduncle from the right ilium.

A nearly complete specimen referred to Epachthosaurus, UNPSJB-PV 920, was recovered during field research conducted as part of the project Los vertebrados de la Formación Bajo Barreal, Provincia de Chubut, Patagonia, Argentina by researchers from the Laboratorio de Paleontologia de Vertebrados of the Universidad Nacional de la Patagonia. The specimen, which is one of the most complete titanosaurian skeletons known, consists of a complete, well-preserved, and articulated skeleton only missing the skull, neck, four or five cranial dorsal vertebrae, and several distal caudals.

== Description ==
The autapomorphies that distinguish Epachthosaurus from other genera are: middle and caudal dorsal vertebrae with unique articular processes extending ventrolaterally from the hyposphene; a strongly developed intraprezygapophyseal lamina, and processes projecting laterally from the dorsal portion of the spinodiapophyseal lamina; hyposphene-hypantrum articulations in caudals 1–14; and a pedal phalangeal formula of 2-2-3-2-0. The genus shares the following apomorphies with various titanosaurians: caudal vertebrae with ventrally expanded posterior centrodiapophyseal laminae; six sacral vertebrae; an ossified ligament or tendon above the sacral neural spines; procoelous proximal, middle, and distal caudal centra with well-developed distal articular condyles; semilunar sternal plates with cranioventral ridges; humeri with squared proximolateral margins and proximolateral processes; unossified carpals; greatly reduced manual phalanges; nearly horizontal, craniolaterally expanded iliac preacetabular processes; pubes proximodistally longer than ischia; and transversely expanded ischia.

== Classification ==
Epachthosaurus is considered to be the most basal titanosaurian known with procoelous caudal vertebrae.

Below is a phylogenetical cladogram showing the position of Epachthosaurus within Titanosauria:

- Titanosauria
  - Phuwiangosaurus
  - Andesaurus
  - - Argyrosauridae
      - Argyrosaurus
      - Paralititan
    - - Aeolosauridae
        - Janenschia
        - Aeolosaurus
      - - Santa Rosa indet.
        - Antarctosauridae
          - Isisaurus
          - - Alamosaurus
            - - Opisthocoelicaudia
              - Antarctosaurus
              - Argentinosaurus
        - - Aegyptosaurus
          - - Epachthosaurus
            - - Nemegtosauridae
              - - Lirainosaurus
                - Saltasauridae

The cladogram below follows Mocho et al. (2019), placing Epachthosaurus within Lithostrotia, instead of a basal titanosaur.

- Lithostrotia
  - Malawisaurus
  - - - Paludititan
      - Lohuecotitan
    - - Epachthosaurus
      - - - Opisthocoelicaudiinae
            - Alamosaurus
            - Opisthocoelicaudia
        - - - Saltasaurinae
              - Neuquensaurus
              - - Rocasaurus
                - Saltasaurus
          - - - Lirainosaurinae
                - Lirainosaurus
                - - Atsinganosaurus
                  - Ampelosaurus
            - - Bonatitan
              - - - Rapetosaurus
                  - Nemegtosaurus
                - - Aeolosaurinae
                    - Gondwanatitan
                    - Aeolosaurus
                  - Rinconsauria
                    - Rinconsaurus
                    - - Muyelensaurus
                      - - Bonitasaura
                        - Lognkosauria
                          - Mendozasaurus
                          - Futalognkosaurus

== Paleoecology ==
Epachthosaurus is known from the early Late Cretaceous of the Bajo Barreal Formation. Other fauna from the formation include the basal chelid turtles Bonapartemys and Prochelidella, the abelisaurid Xenotarsosaurus, and an unidentified carnotaurine abelisaurid. The Bajo Barreal Formation dates back to the late Cenomanian and early Turonian of the Cretaceous. Other genera that lived alongside Epachthosaurus are Secernosaurus, Notohypsilophodon, Drusilasaura, Campylodoniscus, Aniksosaurus, and Sarmientosaurus.
