= Prochelidella =

Prochelidella Temporal range: Albian-Early Coniacian ~111–89.3 Ma

Scientific classification
- Kingdom: Animalia
- Phylum: Chordata
- Class: Reptilia
- Order: Testudines
- Suborder: Pleurodira
- Family: Chelidae
- Subfamily: Chelinae
- Genus: †Prochelidella; Lapparent de Broin & de la Fuent 2001

Species
- P. argentinae Lapparent de Broin & de la Fuente 2001; P. buitreraensis Maniel et al., 2020; P. cerrobarcinae De la Fuente et al., 2011; P. palomoi Maniel, de la Fuente & Filippi, 2022; P. portezuelae De la Fuente 2003

Extinct genus of turtles

Prochelidella is an extinct genus of Early to Late Cretaceous chelid turtles from the Bajo Barreal, Candeleros, Cerro Barcino and Portezuelo Formations of the Cañadón Asfalto, Golfo San Jorge and Neuquén Basins in Patagonia, Argentina. It includes the following species:

- P. argentinae Lapparent de Broin & de la Fuente 2001
- P. buitreraensis Maniel et al., 2020
- P. cerrobarcinae De la Fuente et al., 2011
- P. palomoi Maniel, de la Fuente & Filippi, 2022
- P. portezuelae De la Fuente, 2003

== Prochelidella buitreraensis ==
Prochelidella buitreraensis is known from the Huincul Formation of Argentina, which is dated to the Albian stage of the Early Cretaceous. Its specific epithet references the paleontological site La Buitrera, where its fossils were discovered.

The remains are notable for their exceptional state of preservation, which includes the presence of the skull. Besides, the remains of cervical vertebrae, the shell and the appendicular skeleton have also been found. The remains were found in Cañadón de las Tortugas, at La Buitrera, Río Negro Province, Argentine Patagonia, by scientists from CONICET. The remains of Prochelydella buitreraensis are hosted at Carlos Ameghino Provincial Museum in the city of Cipolletti, Río Negro Province, Argentina. Its discovery appears to show that turtles and tortoises at some point in their early history were incapable of hiding their heads into their shells.
