= Cerro Carnerero Formation =

Geological formation in Argentina

- Stratigraphic range: Toarcian-Bajocian; ~180–170 Ma
- Type: Geological formation
- Unit of: Lonco Trapial Group
- Underlies: Cañadón Puelman Formation
- Overlies: Los Tobianos Formation
- Thickness: 440 m (1,440 ft)

Lithology
- Primary: Claystone, tuff
- Other: Conglomerate

Location
- Coordinates: 44.0°S 69.5°W
- Approximate paleocoordinates: 41.8°S 28.5°W
- Region: Chubut Province
- Country: Argentina
- Extent: Golfo San Jorge Basin

Type section
- Named for: Cerro Carnerero
- Named by: Herbst
- Year defined: 1966
- Cerro Carnerero Formation (Argentina)

The Cerro Carnerero Formation is a geological formation of the Golfo San Jorge Basin in Chubut Province, Patagonia, Argentina.

== Description ==
The claystones and tuffs of the approximately 440 metres (1,440 ft) thick formation, belonging to the Lonco Trapial Group, were deposited in a fluvial environment.

The formation dates back to the Middle Jurassic (Toarcian stage) and has preserved fossils of Cladophlebis oblonga, and Amygdalodon patagonicus.

The fossiliferous beds rest on Liassic beds with Harpoceras subplanatum, and below the Middle to Upper Jurassic Porphyritic Series. Called the "Cerro Carnerero" beds, Rauhut, 2008, assigned the Cerro Carnerero to the Toarcian to Bajocian.

=== Lithology ===
The formation comprises sandy tuffs and bluish gray claystones, which form part of a continental sedimentary series mixed with porphyritic conglomerates with partly encrusted round pebbles, and bluish gray clays with sandy intercalations and clays in lesser amounts.

== Fossil content ==
=== Vertebrate fauna ===
Dinosaurs
Taxa	Presence	Notes	Images
Genus: Amygdalodon; 1. A. patagonicus	Chubut Province	"Partial skeleton"	

=== Arthropods ===
- Estheria sp.

== See also ==
- List of dinosaur-bearing rock formations
- Cañadón Asfalto Formation
- Posidonia Shale
