= Bajo Barreal Formation =

Geological formations

- Stratigraphic range: Mid Cenomanian-Late Turonian; ~97–90 Ma
- Type: Geological formation
- Unit of: Chubut Group
- Underlies: Lago Colhué Huapí Formation
- Overlies: Castillo Formation

Lithology
- Primary: Sandstone
- Other: Claystone, mudstone, conglomerate, tuff

Location
- Coordinates: 45.3°S 69.6°W
- Approximate paleocoordinates: 51.6°S 46.7°W
- Region: Chubut, Santa Cruz
- Country: Argentina
- Extent: Golfo San Jorge Basin

Type section
- Named by: Teruggi & Rossetto
- Year defined: 1963
- Bajo Barreal Formation (Argentina)

The Bajo Barreal Formation is a geological formation in the Golfo San Jorge Basin of Chubut and Santa Cruz, Argentina whose strata date back to the Middle Cenomanian to Late Turonian. The formation was first described by Teruggi & Rossetto in 1963. The sandstones, claystones, mudstones, conglomerates and tuff were deposited in a fluvial environment. The upper part of formation is laterally equivalent to the Yacimiento El Trébol and Meseta Espinosa Formation and the lower part to the Laguna Palacios, Cañadón Seco and Comodoro Rivadavia Formations. The Bajo Barreal Formation is a reservoir rock in the Golfo San Jorge Basin.

== Fossil content ==
Color key: Taxon / Reclassified taxon / Taxon falsely reported as present / Dubious taxon or junior synonym / Ichnotaxon / Ootaxon / Morphotaxon	Notes; Uncertain or tentative taxa are in small text; ~~crossed out~~ taxa are discredited.

=== Dinosaurs ===
Indeterminate abelisauroids and titanosaurs have been recovered from the formation.

==== Ornithischia ====
Ornithischians of the Bajo Barreal Formation
Genus	Species	Location	Stratigraphic position	Material	Notes	Image
Notohypsilophodon	N. comodorensis		Lower	"Vertebrae, partial fore- and hindlimb"	An elasmarian ornithopod	

==== Sauropods ====
Sauropods of the Bajo Barreal Formation
Genus	Species	Location	Stratigraphic position	Material	Notes	Image
Andesaurus	A. sp.		Lower		A titanosaurian sauropod	
Campylodoniscus	C. ameghinoi		Lower	Maxilla with seven teeth.	A titanosaurian sauropod	
Drusilasaura	D. deseadensis		Upper	"four dorsal vertebrae, one sacral vertebra, six caudal vertebrae, left scapula, dorsal rib fragments, two haemapophyses and indeterminate fragments"	A colossosaurian titanosaur	
Elaltitan	E. lilloi		Lower	A partial skeleton	A lithostrotian titanosaur	
Epachthosaurus	E. sciuttoi		Lower	"Vertebrae [and] partial illium."	A titanosaurian sauropod	
Katepensaurus	K. goicoecheai		Lower	Partial skeleton	A rebbachisaurid	
Rebbachisauridae Indet.	Indeterminate		Lower	Dorsal vertebra	Different from Katepensaurus.	
Sarmientosaurus	S. musacchioi		Lower	A skull	A diamantinasaurian sauropod	

==== Theropods ====
Theropods of the Bajo Barreal Formation
Genus	Species	Location	Stratigraphic position	Material	Notes	Image
Abelisauridae Indet.	Indeterminate		Lower	UNPSJB-PV247 A nearly complete left maxilla	Possibly distinct from Xenotarsosaurus. Estimated to be 6.21 metres (20.4 ft) long, larger than Xenotarsosaurus.	
Abelisauridae Indet.	Indeterminate		Lower	partial skeleton	Different from all other comparable abelisaurids, but can't be compared with Xenotarsosaurus.	
Aniksosaurus	A. darwini		Lower		A basal coelurosaur	
Megaraptoridae Indet.	Indeterminate		Upper part of lower; Lowermost part of upper	Two partial skeletons		
Xenotarsosaurus	X. bonapartei		Lower	A vertebra and a nearly complete hind limb	A brachyrostran abelisaurid	

Other fossils

Other fossils found in the formation include:

- Bonapartemys bajobarrealis
- Prochelidella argentinae
- Anura indet.
- Chelonia indet.
- Crocodylia indet.
- Pterosauria indet.

== See also ==
- List of dinosaur-bearing rock formations
- Mata Amarilla Formation, contemporaneous formation of the Austral Basin
- Lisandro Formation, contemporaneous formation of the Neuquén Basin
