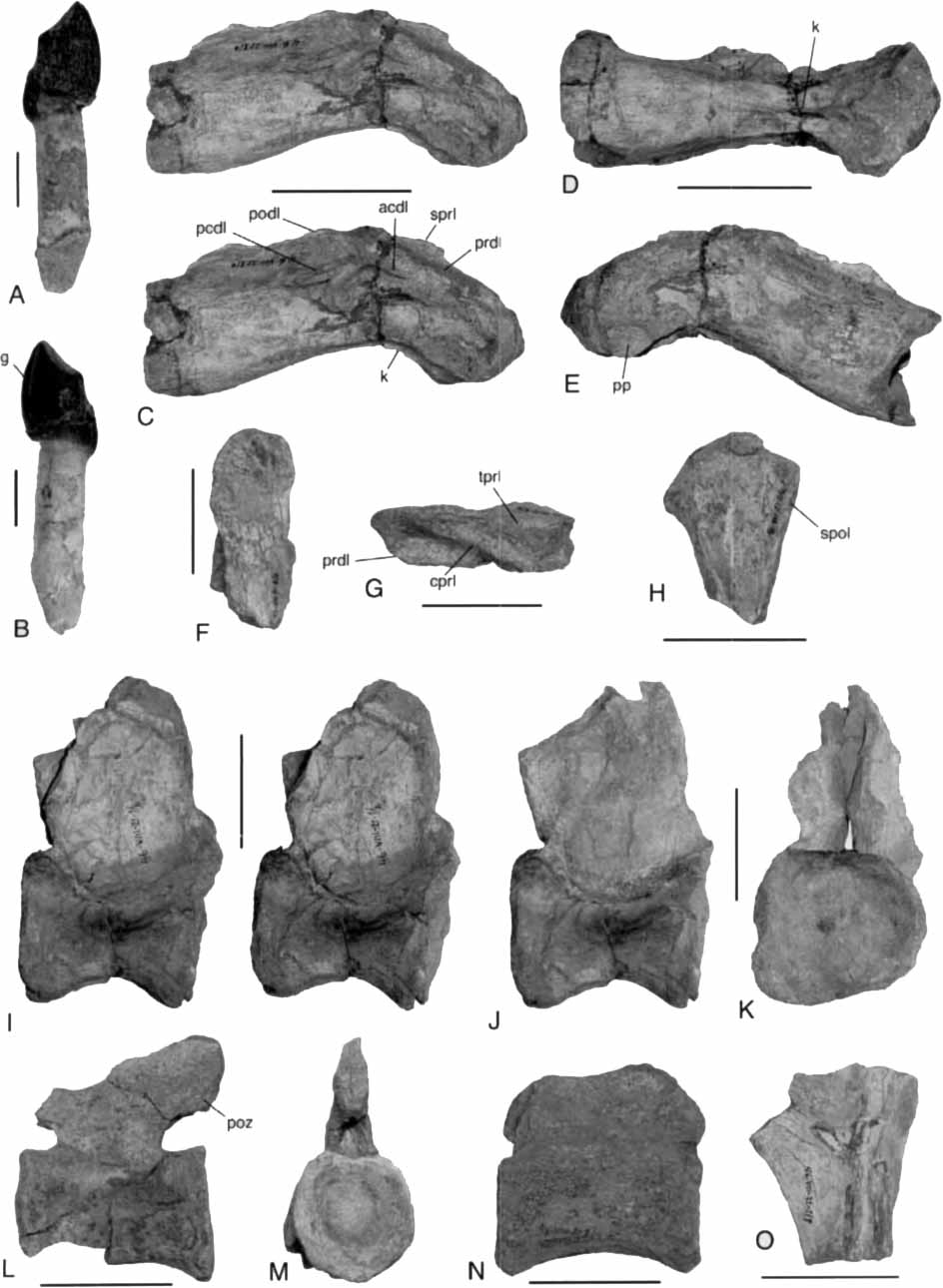
- Holotype specimen (A-H). And lectotype specimen (I-O).

Scientific classification
- Kingdom: Animalia
- Phylum: Chordata
- Class: Reptilia
- Clade: Dinosauria
- Clade: Saurischia
- Clade: †Sauropodomorpha
- Clade: †Sauropoda
- Genus: †Amygdalodon
- Species: †A. patagonicus

Binomial name
- †Amygdalodon patagonicus Cabrera, 1947

= Amygdalodon =

Amygdalodon Temporal range: Toarcian ~180–172 Ma

Extinct genus of reptiles

Amygdalodon (/əmɪɡˈdælədɒn/; "almond tooth" for its almond shaped teeth) is an extinct genus of basal sauropod from the Early Jurassic of Argentina. The type species is Amygdalodon patagonicus. Fossils of Amygdalodon have been found in the Toarcian-aged Cerro Carnerero Formation (about 180-172 million years ago). Very little is known about it, but it is one of the few Jurassic dinosaurs from South America found thus far.

== Discovery ==
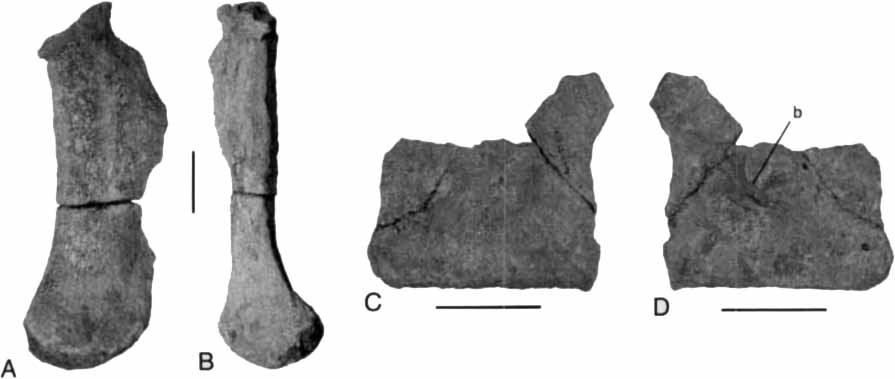
Type material of Amygdalodon, right pubis (A, B), and shoulder-blade (C, D).

The holotype (MLP 46-VIII-21-1) consists of some vertebrae, ribs, four complete and three partial teeth, and a partial pelvis and shoulder-blade, of which was discovered in 1936. The type species, Amygdalodon patagonicus, was described by Cabrera in Argentina in 1947.

Until 1936, sauropod fossils from Argentina were completely unknown. Then, prompted by Piatnitzky's brief mention of "bones of a saurian of no less than 5-7m long", Dr. Tomás Suero took a trip to Chubut to check out deposits overlying the Liassic of the Pampa de Agnia and discovered the remains of a Jurassic sauropod dinosaur around twice the size of Piatnitzky's estimation in 1936.

== Size ==
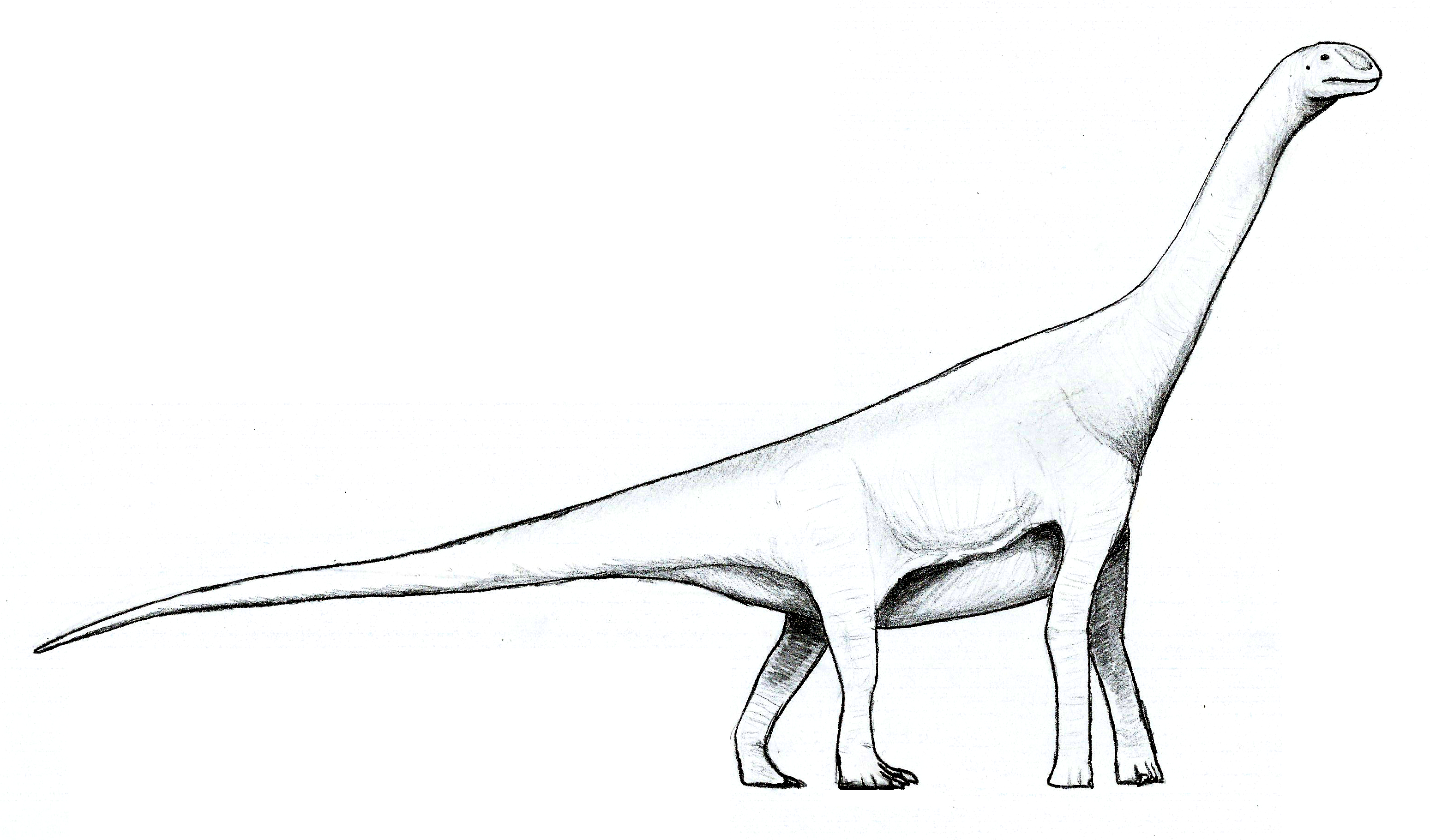
Hypothetical life restoration

Amygdalodon is estimated to have been 12 metres (39 ft) long and 4 metres (13 ft) tall. This quadrupedal dinosaur had an estimated weight of over 5 tonnes (4.9 long tons; 5.5 short tons).

== Classification ==
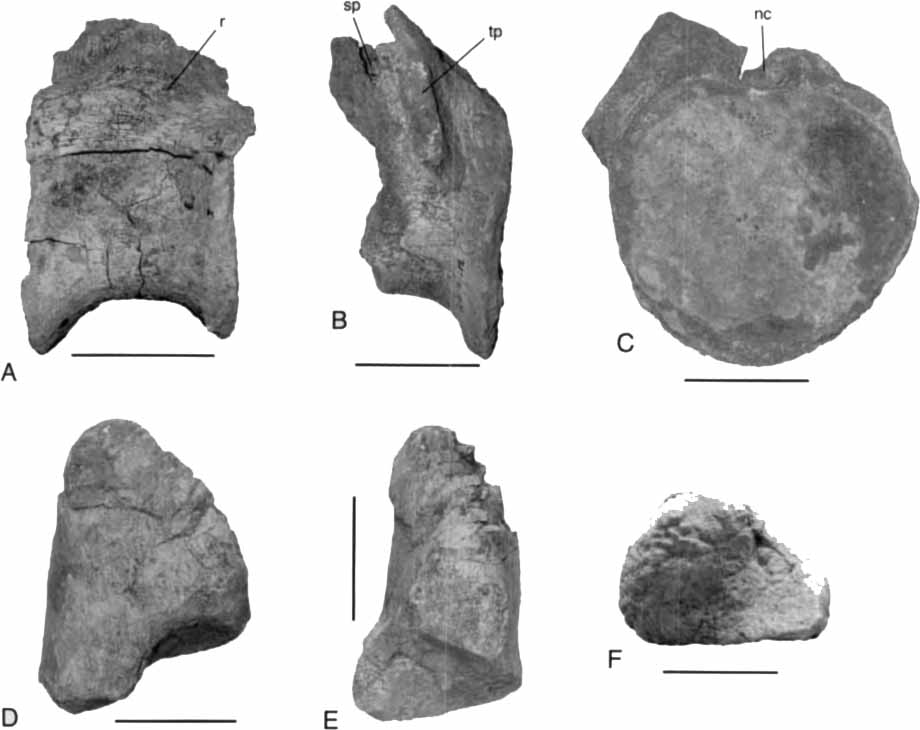
Material referred to Amygdalodon by Casamiquela (1963). Posterior dorsal vertebra with attached proximal fragment of a dorsal rib (A), First sacral vertebra (B, C), Distal end of right tibia, (D, E, F).

Rauhut (2003) placed Amygdalodon as Eusauropoda incertae sedis based on examination of the type material. Later, a cladistic analysis conducted by Carballido et al. (2010) recovered the genus as a non-eusauropod sauropod. Holwerda and Pol (2018) concurred, recovering Amygdalodon as sister to Isanosaurus. A basal sauropod classification for Amygdalodon was supported by Pol and colleagues in 2022, with it showing the first signs of dental modification for bulk feeding that is retained in later sauropods, but it does not have the vertebral features found in more derived sauropods. They found it in a polytomy with the Asian taxon Gongxianosaurus, and possibly related to South American Volkheimeria, though the latter had a very labile position.

- Sauropoda
  - Melanorosaurus
  - Sefapanosaurus
  - Leonerasaurus
  - Aardonyx
  - - Lessemsauridae
      - Lessemsaurus
      - Antetonitrus
      - - Ledumahadi
        - Ingentia
  - - Gongxianosaurus
    - - Amygdalodon
      - Volkheimeria
    - - Pulanesaura
      - - Isanosaurus
        - Gravisauria
          - - Sanpasaurus
            - - Tazoudasaurus
              - Vulcanodon
          - - Volkheimeria
            - - - Archaeodontosaurus
                - Volkheimeria
              - - Volkheimeria
                - Eusauropoda
