= Laguna Palacios Formation =

Geological formation in Argentina

- Stratigraphic range: Maastrichtian
- Type: Geological formation
- Unit of: Chubut Group
- Underlies: Río Chico Group (Salamanca Formation)
- Overlies: Lago Colhué Huapí Formation

Lithology
- Primary: Tuff

Location
- Coordinates: 44°53′38″S 69°23′01″W
- Region: Central Patagonia
- Country: Argentina
- Extent: Golfo San Jorge Basin

Type section
- Named for: Laguna Palacios
- Named by: Bonaparte
- Year defined: 1978
- Laguna Palacios Formation (Argentina)

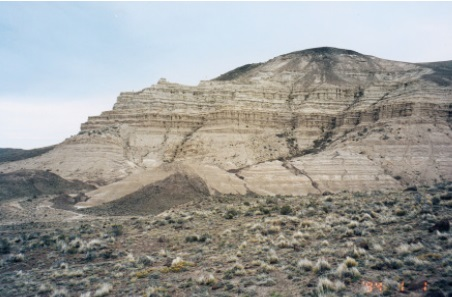
A photo of the Laguna Palacios Formation.

The Laguna Palacios Formation is a Maastrichtian geologic formation of the Chubut Group in the Golfo San Jorge Basin in Patagonia, Argentina. The formation partly overlies and partly is laterally equivalent to the Lago Colhué Huapí Formation and is overlain by the Salamanca Formation of the Río Chico Group. The formation comprises tuff reworked by fluvial activity and paleosols. The Laguna Palacios Formation has provided fossilized bee nests.

== Environment ==
Primary deposits of the Lagunas Palacios Formation consist of massive sheet beds of vitric and crystal tuffs and chonites, tuffaceous mudstones and claystones with moderate bioturbation and pedified tops. Subordinate fine to medium grained sandstones are in incised lenticular or channel beds with erosive bases. Scarce fine conglomerates appear as channel fills. Modified facies are paleosols originating in aeolian ash and sand substrate. These record root traces, waterlogging, desiccation cracks, and in situ fossil tree stumps. The sedimentary scenario was similar to the loess plains with few rivers and ponds. Pyroclastics supplied as distal ash fallout were pedified by subordinated fluvial streams. This environment was comparable to the Pleistocene-Holocene loess Pampean Plain. Paleosols ranged from entisols to andosols and alfisosols/mollisols, representing a temperate subhumid-seasonal climate in a grass-covered landscape. Halictin bee nests and Coelopteran pupal chambers have been found in this formation, with the nests being some of the earliest evidence for eusociality in bees.

== See also ==
- List of dinosaur-bearing rock formations
  - List of stratigraphic units with few dinosaur genera
