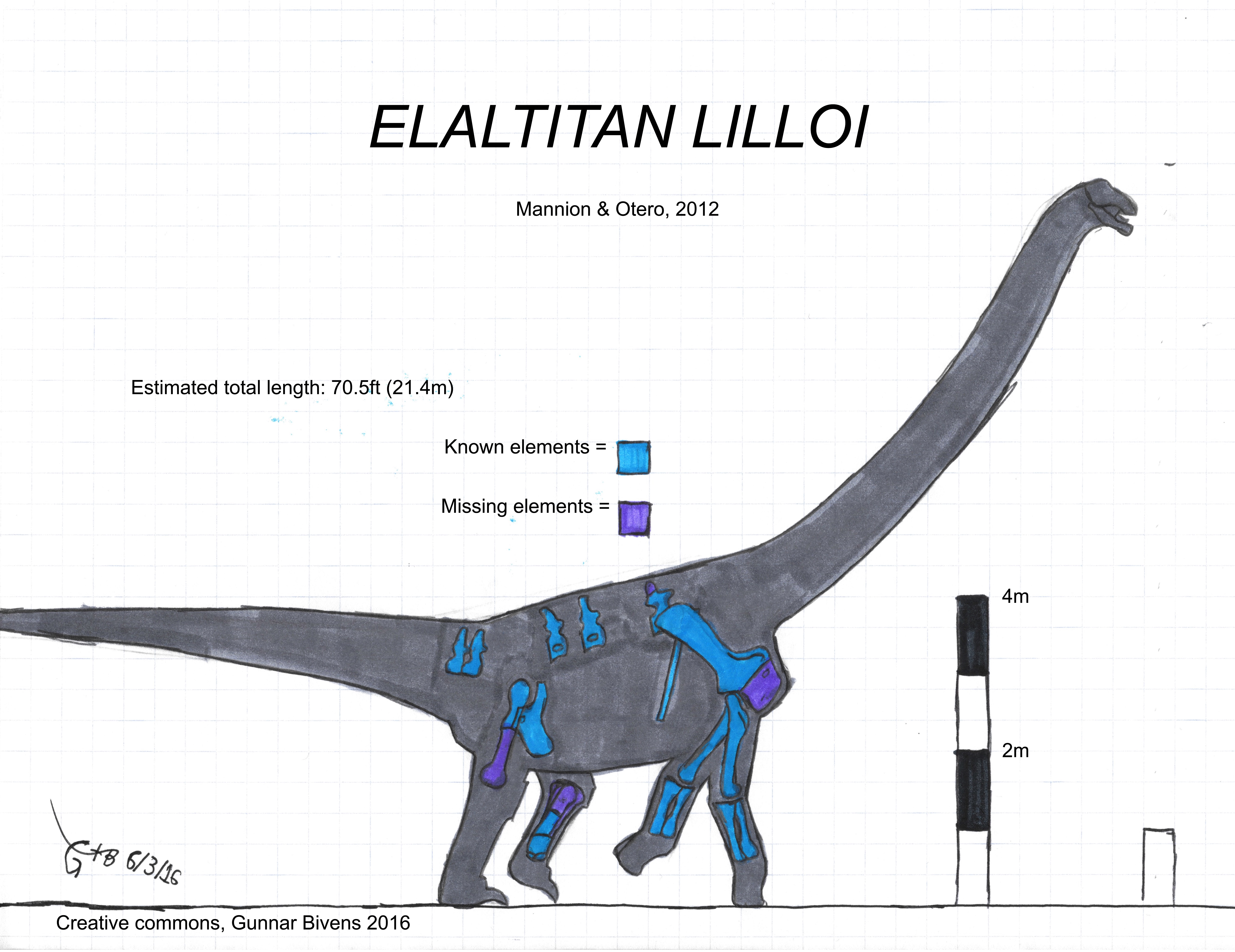
- Skeletal restoration, known material in blue

Scientific classification
- Kingdom: Animalia
- Phylum: Chordata
- Class: Reptilia
- Clade: Dinosauria
- Clade: Saurischia
- Clade: †Sauropodomorpha
- Clade: †Sauropoda
- Clade: †Macronaria
- Clade: †Titanosauria
- Clade: †Lithostrotia
- Genus: †Elaltitan; Mannion & Otero, 2012

Type species
- †Elaltitan lilloi Mannion & Otero, 2012

= Elaltitan =

Elaltitan Temporal range: Cenomanian-Turonian ~96.5–89.3 Ma

Extinct genus of dinosaurs

Elaltitan is an extinct genus of large lithostrotian titanosaur sauropod dinosaur known from the Late Cretaceous (mid Cenomanian to Turonian stage) of Chubut Province, southern Argentina. It contains a single species, Elaltitan lilloi.

== Etymology ==
Elaltitan was first described and named by Philip D. Mannion and Alejandro Otero in 2012 and the type species is Elaltitan lilloi. The generic name is derived from Elal (pronounced as "ee-lal") - the god of the Tehuelche people of Chubut Province and titan, giant in Greek mythology. The specific name, lilloi, honors Miguel Lillo, for his contribution and legacy to natural sciences in Tucumán.

== Discovery ==
Elaltitan is known only from a single individual, represented by an associated partial postcranial skeleton. The holotype includes both PVL 4628 and MACN-CH 217 comprising three dorsal vertebrae, two caudal vertebrae, left scapula, left humerus, left radius, both ulnae, right pubis, proximal half of right femur, distal part of left tibia, distal two-thirds of left fibula, right astragalus and calcaneum. Elaltitan is the first titanosaur skeleton to preserve an associated calcaneum. Although all of the material was originally housed in the Colección de Paleontología de Vertebrados de la Fundación Instituto Miguel Lillo in Tucumán, Argentina and accessioned as PVL 4628, the dorsal vertebrae and complete caudal vertebra were subsequently moved to the Museo Argentino de Ciencias Naturales "Bernardino Rivadavia" in Buenos Aires, where they were accessioned as MACN-CH 217. The holotype specimen was collected by an expedition of the Fundación Miguel Lillo and the Universidad Nacional de Tucumán, led by José Fernando Bonaparte, from the right (southern) bank of the Senguerr River, in the area between the bend of this river and the Pampa de María Santísima, southeast of the southernmost part of the Sierra de San Bernardo, Chubut Province. It came from the lower member of the Bajo Barreal Formation, dating to the middle Cenomanian to the Turonian stage of the Late Cretaceous period, about 96.5-89.3 million years ago.

== Description ==
The holotype of Elaltitan was originally attributed to Antarctosaurus sp. by Bonaparte & Gasparini (1979), and later tentatively referred to Argyrosaurus by Jaime Powell (1986, 2003). Philip D. Mannion and Alejandro Otero (2012), who named the genus, diagnosed Elaltitan by a unique combination of characters, as well as one autapomorphy. The autapomorphy (unique trait) is the presence of dorsoventrally tall neural arch restricted to anterior half of centrum (excluding condylar ball) in anterior-most caudal vertebrae. Other unusual characters include a spinopostzygapophyseal laminae in middle–posterior dorsal vertebrae bifurcate into medial and lateral branches, an astragalar ascending process that does not extend to the posterior margin of the astragalus and the presence of a calcaneum. Other potentially unusual features were also listed. These traits distinguish Elaltitan from all other titanosauriforms, including Antarctosaurus and Argyrosaurus, as well as other sauropods from the lower member of the Bajo Barreal Formation, such as Drusilasaura and Epachthosaurus. Based on comparisons with the morphologically similar femur of "Antarctosaurus" giganteus, which was measured as 231 cm (91 in) in length, the complete femur of Elaltitan would be approximately the same size. This makes it one of the largest known sauropods ever to have existed. Mannion & Otero (2012) also pointed out that there are currently 39 Cretaceous South American titanosauriform genera considered to be valid, the majority of which (31) are from Argentina. Its weight has been estimated at 42.8 tonnes (42.1 long tons; 47.2 short tons) in 2014, and at 35.4 tonnes (34.8 long tons; 39.0 short tons) in 2018. However, in 2020 Molina-Perez and Larramendi gave a smaller size of 20 meters (66 ft) and 23 tonnes (25.35 short tons).
