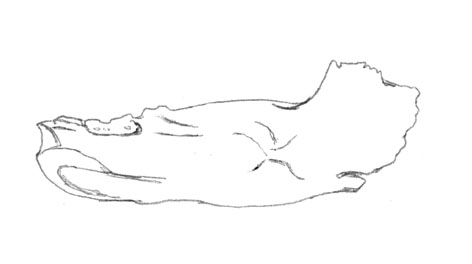
- Holotype mandible

Scientific classification
- Domain: Eukaryota
- Kingdom: Animalia
- Phylum: Chordata
- Clade: Dracohors
- Clade: Dinosauria
- Clade: †Ornithischia
- Genus: †Notoceratops; Tapia, 1918
- Species: †N. bonarellii

Binomial name
- †Notoceratops bonarellii Tapia, 1918

Synonyms
- Notoceratops bonarelli Tapia, 1918; von Huene, 1929 (sic); Notoceratops Bonarelli Tapia, 1918

= Notoceratops =

Notoceratops Temporal range: Late Cretaceous, ~77–66 Ma

Extinct genus of dinosaurs

Notoceratops (meaning "southern horned face") is a dubious genus of extinct ornithischian dinosaur. The genus was described based on an incomplete, toothless left dentary (now lost) from the Late Cretaceous of Patagonia (in Argentina), probably dating to the Campanian or Maastrichtian. Initially classified as a putative ceratopsian found in the Lago Colhué Huapi Formation, the lost fragmentary holotype precludes confident referral of this taxon within ornithischians, with some researchers suggesting that it belongs to a hadrosaur instead.

== Discovery and naming ==
In 1918, palaeontologist Augusto Tapia (1893–1966) discovered the genus holotype. He also named the type species, N. bonarellii (originally spelt as Notoceratops Bonarelli), in 1918. The generic name is derived from Greek notos, "the south", keras, "horn" and ops, "face". The specific name honours Guido Bonarelli (1871-1951), who advised Tapia in his study of the find. By present conventions the epithet is spelled bonarellii, thus without a capital B. In many later publications the specific name is misspelled "bonarelli", with a single "i", from the incorrect assumption it would be derived from a Latinised "Bonarell~ius". The fossil, found near the Lago Colhué Huapi in Chubut, was eventually described by Friedrich von Huene in 1929, but it has since been lost.

== Phylogeny ==
Originally referred as a ceratopsian by Tapia in 1918, it was later dismissed because no other members of that group were known from the Southern Hemisphere. However, the 2003 discovery of another possible ceratopsian, Serendipaceratops, from Australia could change this view. Notoceratops has since been considered a nomen dubium and may have been a hadrosaur instead. An analysis published by Tom Rich et al. (2014), which focused on the validity of Serendipaceratops, also examined the published material from Notoceratops and concluded that the holotype had ceratopsian features.
