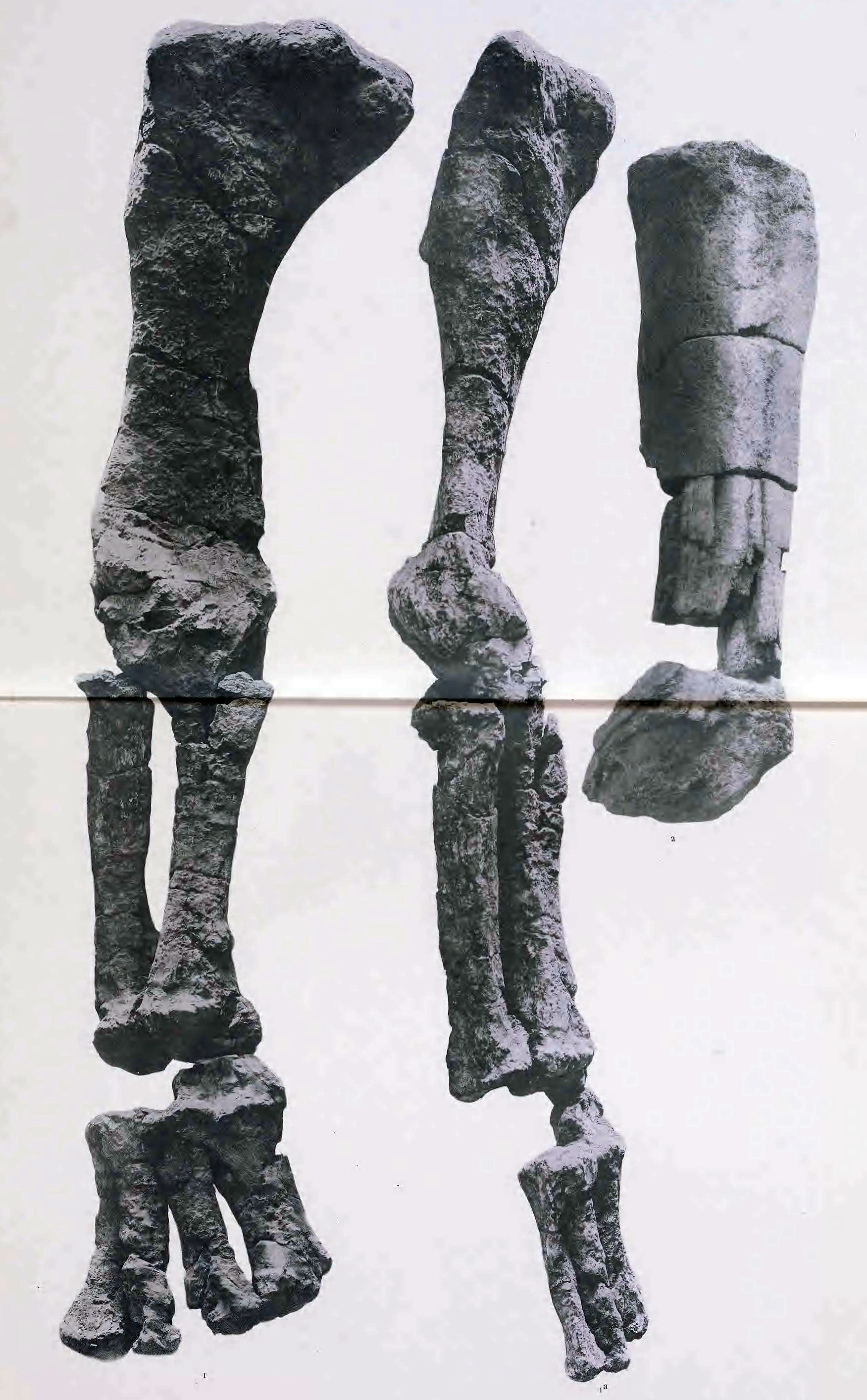
- Holotype forelimb and assigned femur as depicted in 1893

Scientific classification
- Kingdom: Animalia
- Phylum: Chordata
- Class: Reptilia
- Clade: Dinosauria
- Clade: Saurischia
- Clade: †Sauropodomorpha
- Clade: †Sauropoda
- Clade: †Macronaria
- Clade: †Titanosauria
- Clade: †Lithostrotia
- Genus: †Argyrosaurus; Lydekker, 1893
- Species: †A. superbus

Binomial name
- †Argyrosaurus superbus Lydekker, 1893

= Argyrosaurus =

Argyrosaurus Temporal range: Late Cretaceous 70–66 Ma

Genus of herbivorous titanosaurian sauropod dinosaur

Argyrosaurus (/ˌɑːrdʒaɪroʊˈsɔːrəs/ AR-jy-roh-SOR-əs) is a genus of titanosaurian sauropod dinosaur that lived about 70 million years ago, during the Late Cretaceous Period of what is now Argentina.

== Discovery and naming ==
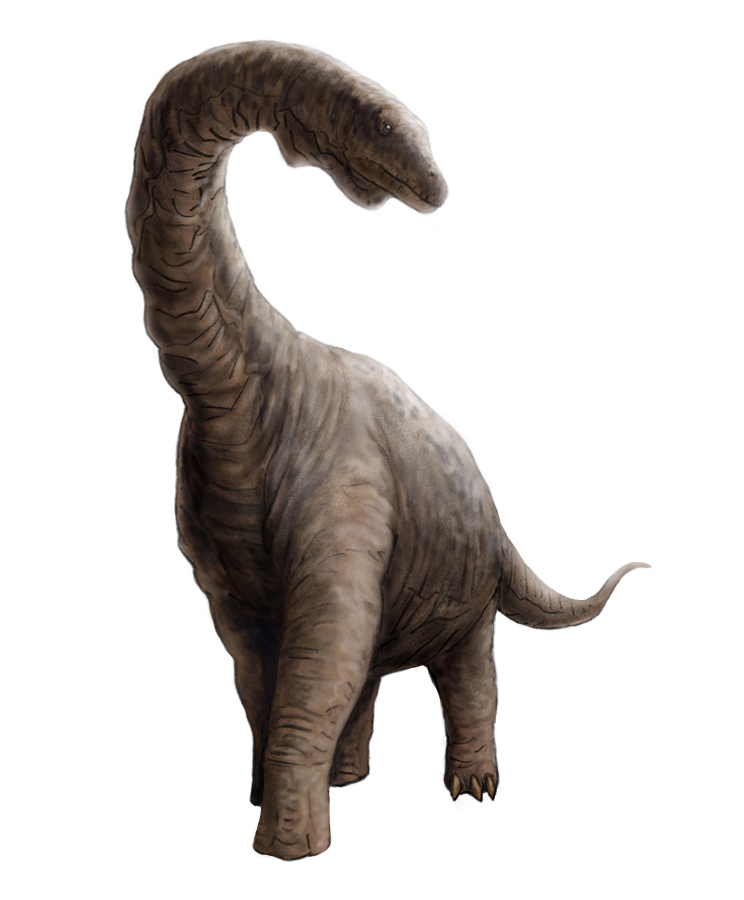
Hypothetical life restoration

The type species, Argyrosaurus superbus, was formally described by Richard Lydekker in 1893.

The holotype specimen of Argyrosaurus superbus is a huge left forelimb, MLP 77-V-29-1. found at Chico River, a Campanian/Maastrichtian horizon in the Lago Colhué Huapi Formation. The material includes the humerus, ulna, radius, and all five metacarpals. Recent stratigraphic information from the Lago Colhue Huapi Formation has the area that the holotype was collected from being a more probable early late Maastrichtian age instead of early Coniacian.

When discovered, the forelimb was apparently a part of a complete skeleton, however, during excavation the rest of the remains were completely destroyed. In the same publication, Lydekker assigned a partial left femur from Chubut Province, MLP 21, to Argyrosaurus but he did not explain his reasoning why he thought the femur was referable to the genus. He also assigned two caudal vertebra centra, MLP 22, from the Santa Cruz Province. After these specimens, other remains were found, including other limb bones, a clavicle, a pubic bone and some tail vertebrae that were referred to the same genus.

In 1929 Friedrich von Huene referred several specimens to Argyrosaurus; a caudal centrum (DGM [number unknown]) from Chubut Province, three caudal centra MACN 5205 from Santa Cruz Province, a right femur MLP 27 from Neuquén Province, another right femur FMNH 13018 which measures over 2 meters (6.6 ft) long from Chubut Province, a small right humerus MACN 5017 from Neuquén Province, and the distal end of a humerus, half of a radius, and a rib fragment, MMAB [number unknown], from Uruguay.

A complete right femur FMNH 13019 and left tibia FMNH 13020 from Chubut Province were originally referred to Antarctosaurus by Von Huene in 1929, however, in 2003 Jaime Eduardo Powell tentatively referred them to cf. Argyrosaurus.

In 1979 Bonaparte and Gasparini referred a partial skeleton, PLV 4628/MACN-CH 217, which included limb material and several vertebrae from Chubut Province to Argyrosaurus.

Although these numerous other remains have been referred, in 2012 Philip Mannion and Alejandro Otero considered the holotype remains the only material which unambiguously pertains to the genus. Many of the referred specimens either have no overlapping material, lack key features in the holotype, or were not illustrated making not possible to assign them without being restudied. Most of the referred specimens were considered indeterminate titanosaurs. They also considered one of the referred specimens, the partial skeleton PLV 4628/MACN-CH 217, to be its own genus which they called Elaltitan.

The genus name means 'silver lizard' from Greek argyros, 'silver', and sauros, 'lizard', because it was discovered in Argentina, which literally means 'silver land'. The specific epithet means "proud" in Latin.

== Description ==
A hypothetical scale diagram showing the Argyrosaurus holotype forelimb compared to some humans, with known material in white

Argyrosaurus was a medium-sized sauropod which is estimated to measure 17 metres (56 ft) long and weighing up to 12 tonnes (12 long tons; 13 short tons) according to Paul. However, in 2012 Thomas Holtz gave a higher estimation at 28 metres (92 ft) in length and a possible weight of 43.5-50.8 tonnes (48-56 short tons). More recently it was listed at 21 metres (69 ft) and 26 tonnes (28.6 short tons).

It is distinguished from other genera by the following unique features:

- the medial side of the humerus has a wide ridge that projects forward
- the midshaft of the humerus is extremely compressed
- the width of the distal end of the radius is only slightly greater than the midshaft width
- the radius is subtriangular when viewed from the distal end
- the metacarpals are extremely elongated
