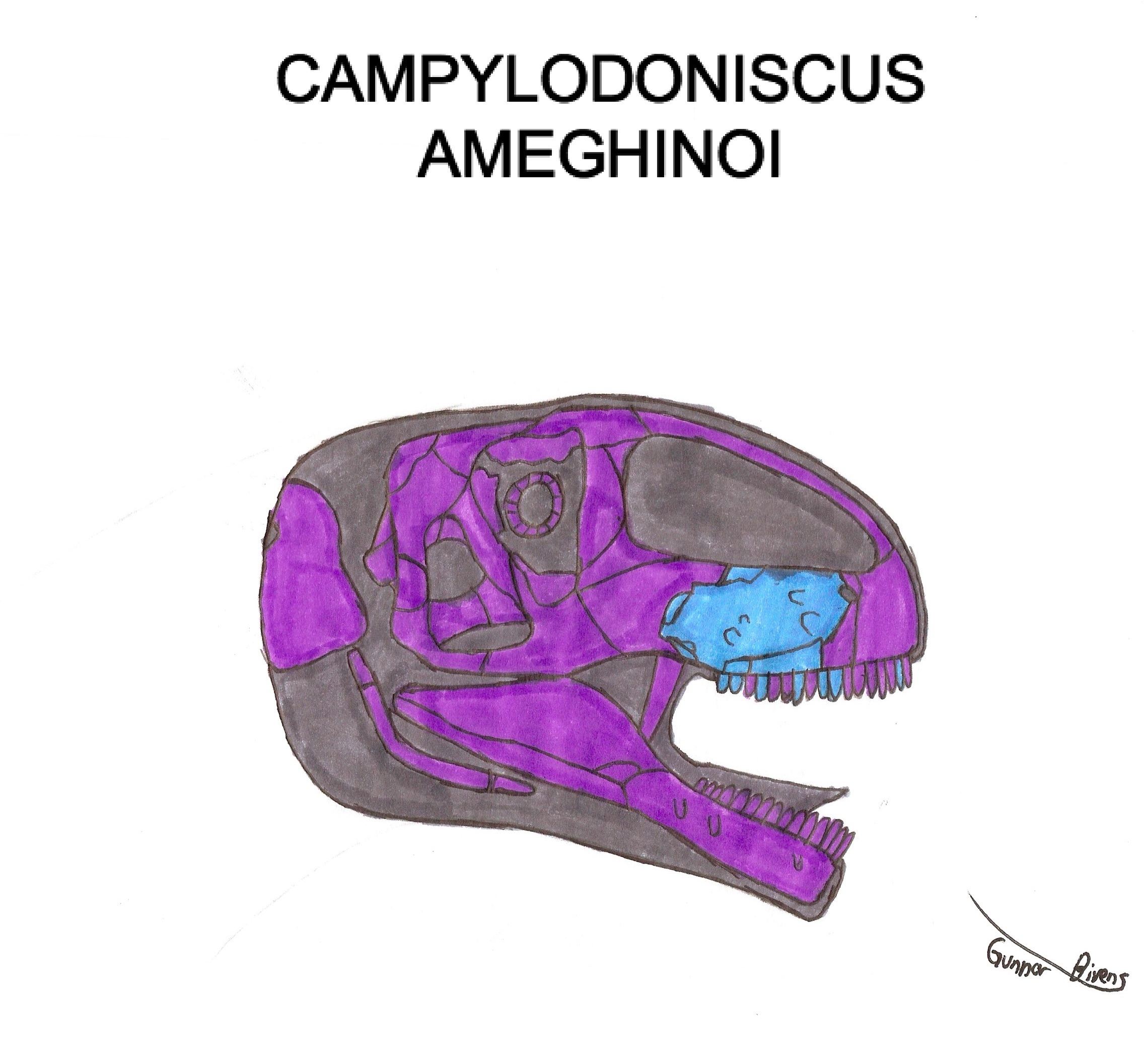
- Skull reconstruction, known material in blue

Scientific classification
- Domain: Eukaryota
- Kingdom: Animalia
- Phylum: Chordata
- Clade: Dinosauria
- Clade: Saurischia
- Clade: †Sauropodomorpha
- Clade: †Sauropoda
- Clade: †Macronaria
- Clade: †Titanosauria
- Genus: †Campylodoniscus; Haubold & Kuhn, 1961

Type species
- †Campylodoniscus ameghinoi (von Huene, 1929 [originally Campylodon])

Synonyms
- Campylodon ameghinoi von Huene, 1929 (preoccupied)

= Campylodoniscus =

Campylodoniscus Temporal range: Late Cretaceous, 95 Ma

Extinct genus of dinosaurs

Campylodoniscus is a genus of titanosaur sauropod dinosaur from the Late Cretaceous Period of what is now Argentina.

The type species was first named and described by Friedrich von Huene in 1929 as Campylodon ameghinoi, the genus name meaning 'bent tooth', from Greek καμπυλος, 'bent' or 'curved' (as of a bow) and ὀδών meaning 'tooth'. The specific name honours Florentino Ameghino. In 1961 H. Haubold and O. Kuhn noted that the name was pre-occupied by a fish and renamed the genus into Campylodoniscus, the diminutive.

The fossil remains of Campylodoniscus were found in the Bajo Barreal Formation and consist of a single jaw bone, the maxilla, holding seven teeth.

Campylodoniscus dates to the Cenomanian (95 Ma). It is sometimes estimated as being around twenty meters in length.

Campylodoniscus is probably a member of the Titanosauria. Some researchers consider it a nomen dubium.
