= Golfo San Jorge Basin =

Sedimentary basin in Argentina

- Cuenca del Golfo San Jorge
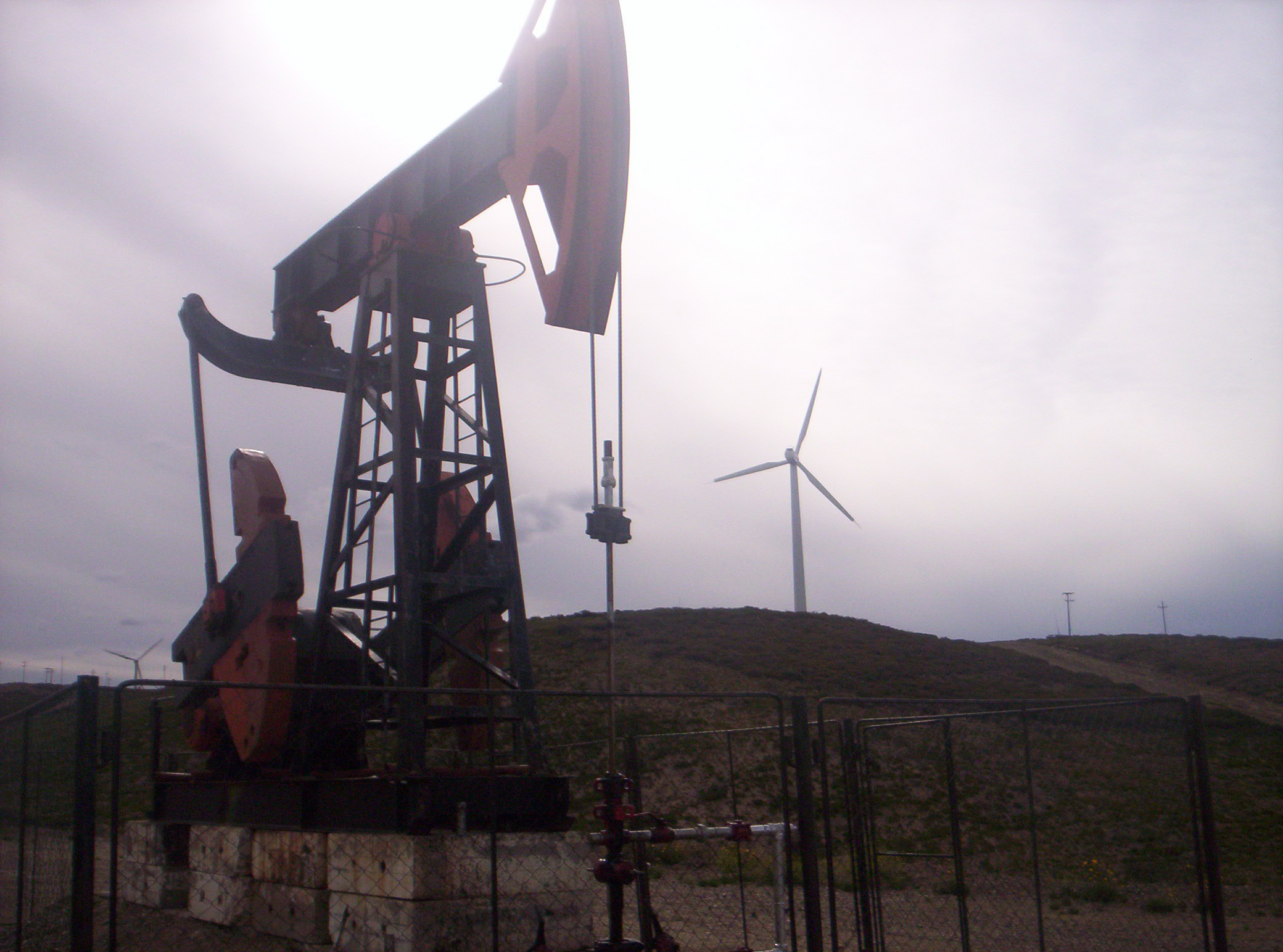
- Oil well near the port city of Comodoro Rivadavia

- Location of the basin in Argentina
- Coordinates: 45°00′S 67°50′W
- Etymology: San Jorge Gulf
- Location: Southern South America
- Region: Patagonia
- Country: Argentina
- States: Chubut, Santa Cruz
- Cities: Comodoro Rivadavia

Characteristics
- On/Offshore: Both
- Boundaries: North Patagonian Massif, Deseado Massif, Andes
- Part of: Southern Atlantic rift basins
- Area: 170,000 km^{2} (66,000 sq mi)

Hydrology
- Sea: South Atlantic
- River: Chico River
- Lakes: Lake Musters and Lake Colhué Huapí

Geology
- Basin type: Rift
- Plate: South American
- Orogeny: Opening of the South Atlantic
- Age: Early Jurassic-Pleistocene
- Stratigraphy: Stratigraphy
- Fields: Cañadón León, Cerro Dragón, Diadema, El Tordillo

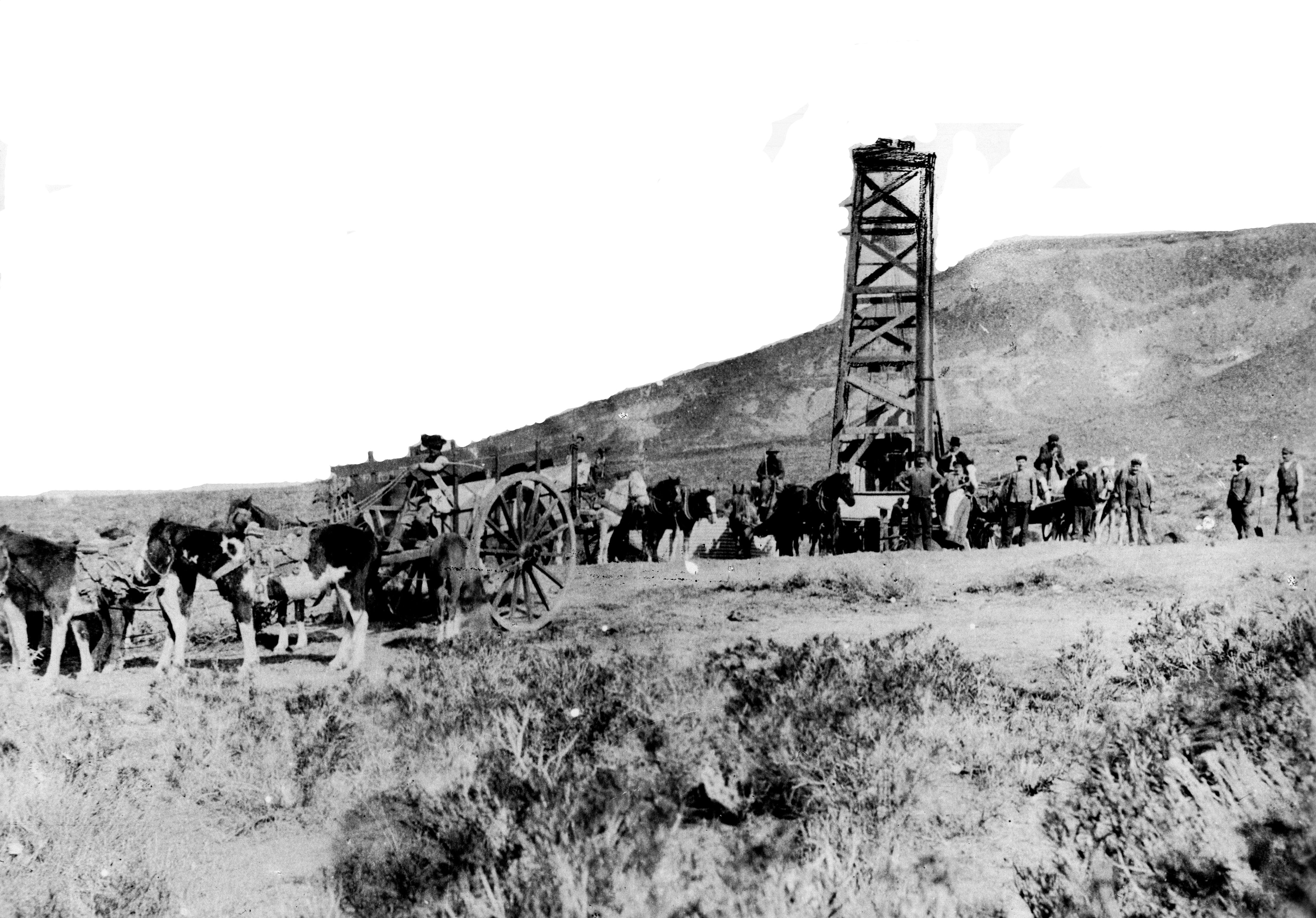
Photograph of the first oil well in Comodoro Rivadavia

The Golfo San Jorge Basin (Spanish: Cuenca del Golfo San Jorge) is a hydrocarbon-rich sedimentary basin located in eastern Patagonia, Argentina. The basin covers the entire San Jorge Gulf and an inland area west of it, having one half located in Santa Cruz Province and the other in Chubut Province. The northern boundary of the basin is the North Patagonian Massif while the Deseado Massif forms the southern boundary of the basin. The basin has largely developed under condition of extensional tectonics, including rifting.

The basin is of paleontological significance as it hosts six out of 22 defining formations for the SALMA classification, the geochronology for the Cenozoic used in South America.

At the center of the basin accumulated sediments reach more than 8,000 metres (26,000 ft) of thickness. Oil was first discovered in 1907 and over the years it has become the second most productive hydrocarbon basin in Argentina after Neuquén Basin.

== Stratigraphy ==
The stratigraphy of the Golfo San Jorge Basin covers the following units:

Unit		Age bold is SALMA type	Tectonic regime	Depositional environment	Thickness (m)	Petroleum geology
Tehuelche Shingle		Pleistocene		Glacio-fluvial	40	
Río Mayo		Mayoan				
Santa Cruz		Santacrucian		Fluvio-deltaic	200	
Patagonia		Santacrucian		Shallow marine	280	
Sarmiento; Colhué Huapí Mb. Chenque		Colhuehuapian		Fluvio-lacustrine	120	
Sarmiento; Colhué Huapí Mb. Chenque		Deseadan		Fluvio-lacustrine	120	
Sarmiento; Colhué Huapí Mb. Chenque		Tinguirirican		Fluvio-lacustrine	120	
Río Chico	Koluel Kaike	Divisaderan		Lacustrine	42	
Río Chico	Koluel Kaike	Mustersan		Lacustrine	42	
Río Chico	Casamayor; Las Flores	Casamayoran		Fluvio-lacustrine	44	
Río Chico	Peñas Coloradas	Riochican		Fluvial	42	
Río Chico	Peñas Coloradas	Itaboraian		Fluvial	42	
Río Chico	Las Violetas	Peligran		Fluvial	25	
Salamanca		Peligran		Shallow marine-deltaic-fluvial	200	Petroleum reservoir
Salamanca		Tiupampan		Shallow marine-deltaic-fluvial	200	Petroleum reservoir
Lago Colhué Huapí		Maastrichtian; Campanian		Fluvial		Petroleum reservoir
Yacimiento El Trébol; Meseta Espinosa; Bajo Barreal; Laguna Palacios		Santonian; Aptian	Late sag	Deltaic; Fluvio-lacustrine	4000+	Petroleum reservoir
Cañadón Seco; Comodoro Rivadavia; Bajo Barreal		Santonian; Aptian	Late sag	Alluvial-fluvial-lacustrine	4000+	Petroleum reservoir
Mina El Carmen; Castillo		Santonian; Aptian	Late sag	Fluvio-lacustrine	4000+	Petroleum reservoir
Pozo D-129; Matasiete		Santonian; Aptian	Early sag	Fluvio-lacustrine	1500+	Source rock and petroleum reservoir
Pozo Cerro Guadal		Neocomian	Late rift	Fluvio-lacustrine	560	
Pozo Anticlinal Aguada Bandera		Neocomian	Late rift	Lacustrine	1700+	Source rock
Bahía Laura; Lonco Trapial	Cerro Carnerero	Mid-Late Jurassic	Early rift	Volcaniclastic	1300+	
		Early Jurassic	Pre-rift	Shallow marine	700+	
Basement		Paleozoic				

== See also ==
- Cañadón Asfalto Basin
- Magallanes Basin
- South American land mammal ages
