= Lefipán Formation =

Geologic formation in Argentina

- Stratigraphic range: Maastrichtian-Danian (pre-Tiupampan); ~67–64 Ma
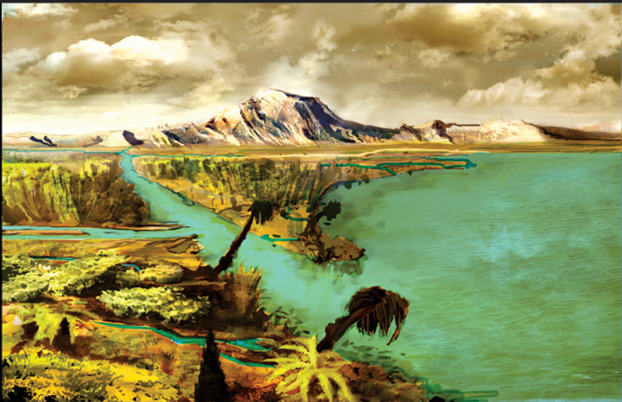
- Type: Geological formation
- Underlies: Barda Colorada Ignimbrite, El Mirador & Collón Cura Formations
- Overlies: Cerro Barcino, Paso del Sapo & Lonco Trapial Formations
- Area: 400 km (250 mi)
- Thickness: Up to 380 m (1,250 ft)

Lithology
- Primary: Mudstone, sandstone
- Other: Conglomerate, siltstone, phosphate

Location
- Coordinates: 42.8°S 69.9°W
- Approximate paleocoordinates: 45.2°S 58.8°W
- Region: Chubut Province
- Country: Argentina
- Extent: Cañadón Asfalto Basin

Type section
- Named for: Lefipán
- Named by: Lesta & Ferello
- Year defined: 1972
- Lefipán Formation (Argentina)

The Lefipán Formation is a Maastrichtian to Danian, straddling the Cretaceous-Paleogene boundary, geologic formation of the Cañadón Asfalto Basin in Chubut Province, Patagonia, Argentina. The up to 380 metres (1,250 ft) thick stratigraphic unit comprises mudstones, sandstones, siltstones and conglomerates, sourced from the North Patagonian Massif and deposited in a deltaic to shallow marine environment with a strong tidal influence. The basin that in those times was connected to the widening South Atlantic Ocean with a seaway connection to the Austral Basin and possibly with the Pacific Ocean.

The formation has provided unique fossil flora assemblages dating to the Cretaceous and Paleogene ages, and are characteristic of the early Cenozoic after the extinction of the dinosaurs. The occurrence of the same taxa in the Maastrichtian and Danian successions suggests that the Cretaceous-Paleogene extinction event did not affect aquatic plant communities, which retained approximately similar structure and composition during the transition between the latest Maastrichtian and the earliest Paleocene. Insect predation on fossil leaves shows a considerably more rapid recovery from the extinction in event in Patagonia (about 4 Ma) than in the Western Interior of North America, estimated at 9 million years.

Fossils of the mammal Cocatherium, the oldest known marsupial or any therian mammal in the Southern Hemisphere, and fish; Hypolophodon patagoniensis and shark teeth were found in the Danian section of the formation. The Danian part of the succession contains fossil flora of Lactoridaceae, presently a monotypic family restricted to the subtropical forests of the Juan Fernández Archipelago in the South Pacific Ocean, offshore Chile. The latest Cretaceous lower section of the formation contains fossils of a plesiosaur; Aristonectes parvidens. The genus Lefipania padillae and species Cocatherium lefipanum and Araucaria lefipanensis were named after the formation.

== Description ==
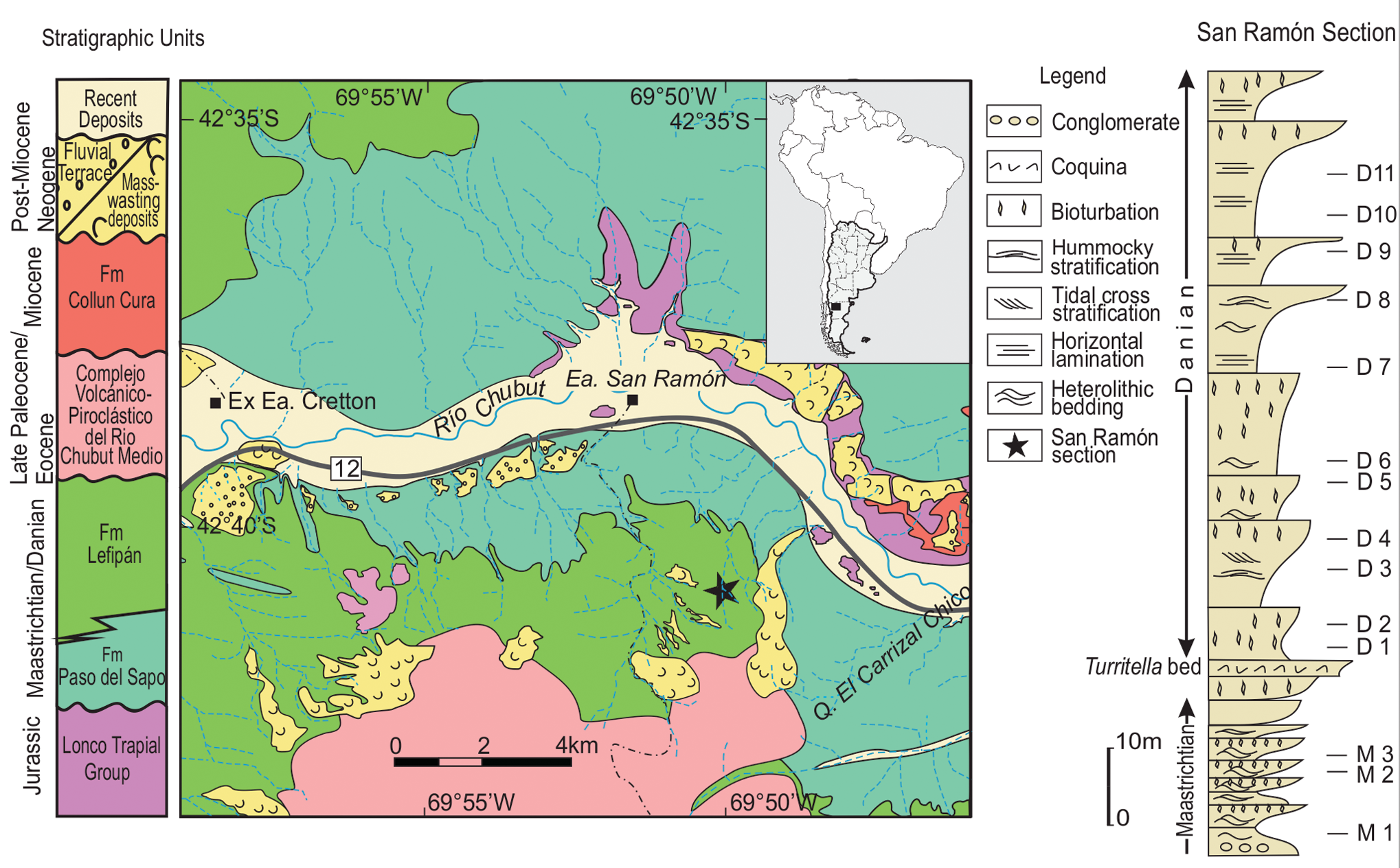
Map of the Cañadón Asfalto Basin with outcrops and stratigraphic column of the Lefipán Formation

The Lefipán Formation was first described by Lesta and Ferello in 1972. The formation was formerly considered a member of the underlying Paso del Sapo Formation. The Lefipán Formation is named after Lefipán, a prominent member of the Mapuche, who are the native inhabitants of the region where the formation crops out.

The Lefipán Formation is found in the Cañadón Asfalto Basin, stretching from the Andean foothills to the Atlantic coast in Patagonia, stretching about 400 kilometres (250 mi). It reaches a maximum thickness of 380 metres (1,250 ft). The formation partly overlies and is partly laterally equivalent to the Paso del Sapo Formation and is unconformably overlain by the Barda Colorada Ignimbrite, part of the Middle Chubut River Volcanic Pyroclastic Complex. On both banks of the Chubut River where the Lefipán Formation crops out, it is overlain by the Huitrera Formation. In other parts of the Cañadón Asfalto Basin, the formation overlies the Cerro Barcino Formation and is unconformably overlain by the Colloncuran Collón Curá Formation or the basalts of El Mirador Formation. In the western part of the basin, the Lefipán Formation rests unconformably on the Early Jurassic Lonco Trapial Formation.

At the fossil site of Cocatherium, the formation is 200 metres (660 ft) thick and comprises a Maastrichtian succession of massive mudstones with intercalating parallel and cross-bedded sandstone beds and coquinas that preserve a molluscan fauna. Bioturbation of Skolithos-Cruziana-type is present in the sandstones. Phosphatic levels occur in both the Maastrichtian and Danian parts of the formation, and the sandstones contain grains of biotite, zircon, kyanite, amphibole and pyroxene, all typical of an igneous and metamorphic provenance. Traces of volcanic glass are also present in the sandstones.

=== Basin history ===
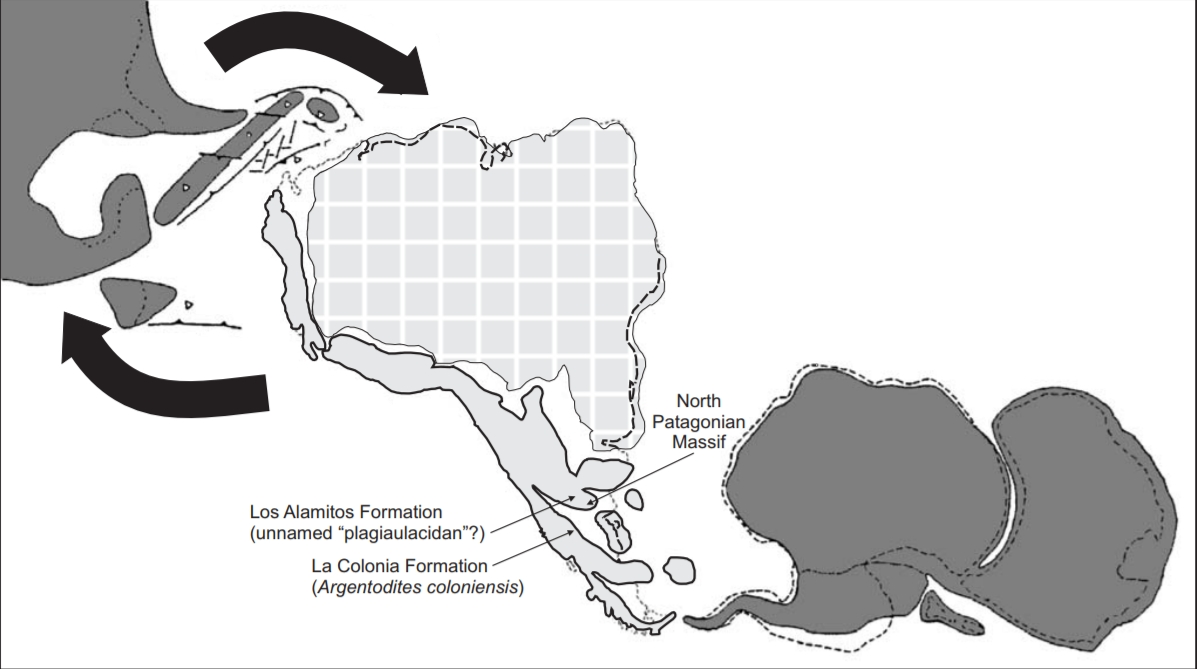
Sketch of the paleogeographic situation of South America during the Late Cretaceous and Early Paleogene, roughly 85 to 63 Ma. The Cañadón Asfalto Basin, located south of the North Patagonian Massif in the South Gondwanan Province (grey), was connected to the South Atlantic.

The Cañadón Asfalto Basin started forming as a rift basin in the earliest Jurassic on top of Permian basement. During the Jurassic and Cretaceous, the basin went through an extensional tectonic regime, with transtensional movements. Several distinct tectonic reactivation cycles occurred, with block rotation due to transpressional forces, characterized in the stratigraphy by regional unconformities. The western side of the basin during the Late Cretaceous experienced a marine transgression of the Atlantic Ocean, depositing the fluvial and estuarine Paso del Sapo Formation and Lefipán Formation.

=== Depositional environment ===
The lower part of the formation was mainly deposited in a shallow marine shoreface environment with strong tidal influence and beds rich in phosphatic concretions. The sandstones of the formation probably represent bars shoals on the coast of an epeiric sea. The environment evolved to a tide to wave-dominated deltaic system in the middle part of the sequence, with a maximum flooding surface representing the transgression and deepening of the basin at the start of the Paleocene. This was the first marine transgression of the Southern Atlantic in the Cañadón Asfalto Basin.

The abundance of iron oxides in the sediments of the formation, as well as ferruginous cement and glauconite indicate the waters were rich in iron, coming from a continent with intense meteoric waters. This suggests the presence of a temperate to hot climate and high humidity in Maastrichtian to Paleocene Patagonia. The provenance area for the sediments was probably the North Patagonian Massif to the northeast of the Cañadón Asfalto Basin. The intense bioturbation in combination with phosphatic levels in the sediments points to a highly organic activity at time of deposition.

The marine sediments of the Lefipán Formation have been correlated with the La Colonia Formation in the Cañadón Asfalto Basin, the Jagüel Formation of the Neuquén Basin to the northwest and the Salamanca Formation of the Golfo San Jorge Basin to the south. The strata of the Lefipán Formation show evidence of syntectonic deposition.

== Paleontological significance ==
The Lefipán Formation has provided fossil teeth of a newly described species of rays, Hypolophodon patagoniensis from the middle section of the formation, in the Paleocene strata, as well as Cocatherium lefipanum, the oldest known marsupial or any therian mammal in the Southern Hemisphere. The mammal, a member of Polydolopimorphia, probably represents a basal polydolopiform, closely related to Roberthoffstetteria. The presence of the mammal predates the Tiupampan South American land mammal age.

== The Cretaceous-Paleogene extinction event ==
The formation is unique in preserving fossil flora both from the Late Cretaceous, before the Cretaceous–Paleogene extinction event and from the Danian, after the mass extinction. The K/Pg boundary impact layer is not preserved in the formation, apparently due to bioturbation. The Maastrichtian part of the succession shows a diverse assemblage comprising angiosperms, including aquatic Nelumbo leaves and fruits, and conifers. The upper part of the formation is represented by an extremely diverse collection of angiosperms (about 70 species), as well as monocots, conifers, and ferns.

Many of the species that disappear at the boundary, return higher in the sequence, indicating their survival in refugial areas. The overall extinction rate is difficult to estimate without more exhaustive studies, but it probably does not exceed 10% of the species. This pattern of recovery is comparable to that observed in New Zealand, where an abrupt disturbance of the vegetation across the K/Pg boundary occurred, but with a low overall extinction rate.

The occurrence of the same taxa in the Maastrichtian and Danian successions, suggests that the Cretaceous-Paleogene extinction event did not affect aquatic plant communities, which retained approximately similar structure and composition during the transition between the latest Maastrichtian and the earliest Paleocene. The presence of the bivalve fauna strongly suggests the basin was connected via a seaway with the Austral Basin and possibly with the Pacific Ocean. The fossils of Retrophyllum superstes is associated with numerous dark, circular marks of about 0.1 to 0.2 millimetres (0.0039 to 0.0079 in) in diameter, that most likely represent piercing-and sucking damage of hemipteran insects. Comparison of the insect damage on the plant leaves between Western Interior North America (WINA) and Patagonia, on flora recovered from the Lefipán Formation, as well as the Salamanca and Peñas Coloradas Formations of the Golfo San Jorge Basin to the south, show that recovery from the Cretaceous-Paleogene mass extinction was considerably faster in Patagonia than in North America. Recovery to pre-extinction levels of insect damage diversity in the southern hemisphere flora occurred in approximately 4 Ma, whereas this recovery took about 9 Ma in North America, supporting the hypothesis of a large-scale geographic heterogeneity in extinction and recovery from the end-Cretaceous extinction event.

=== Maastrichtian ===
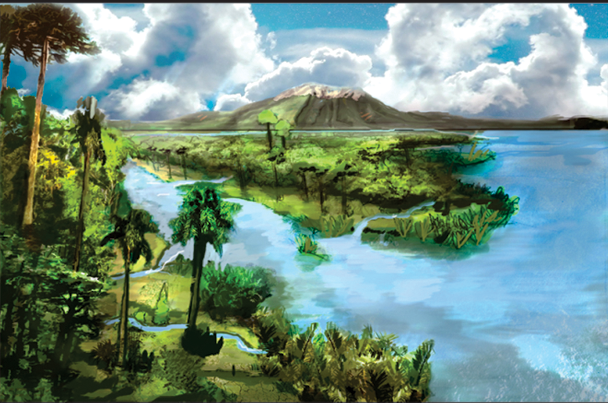
Reconstructed environment of the Maastrichtian

The presence of Spinizonocolpites, related to the tropical mangrove palm Nypa in the Maastrichtian part of the formation indicates specialized shore-line mangrove assemblages. Proteaceae, related to Beauprea and Telopea, together with Aquifoliaceae, may have formed a lower stratum of forests or woodlands. The abundant monocots, primarily Liliaceae and some Sparganiaceae, Chloranthaceae and the diverse ferns may have grown in the understory, associated with ponds, small streams or rivers, just landward of the shoreline.

=== Earliest Danian ===
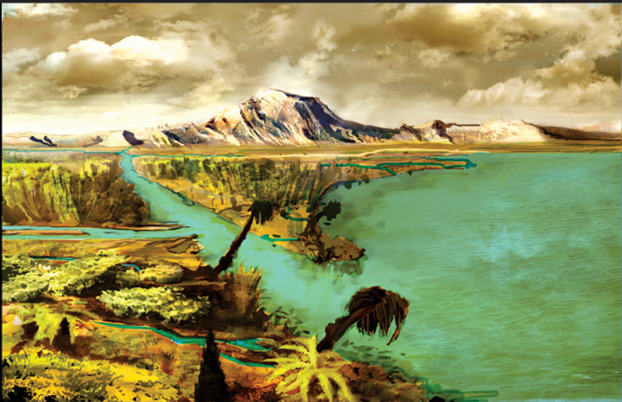
Reconstructed environment of the earliest Danian

The earliest Danian vegetation is characterized by a low diversity and was quite different in species composition and abundance from both the latest Maastrichtian and the subsequent Danian assemblages. The marked reduction in diversity affected all groups of plants, and ferns and monocots in particular, most Proteaceae species except Beauprea-like forms, and nearly all gymnosperms. The presence of marginal, shallow marine, somewhat stressed paleoenvironmental conditions on both sides of the K/Pg boundary indicates that changing depositional factors were unlikely to have had significant importance in driving the observed compositional changes in the palynological assemblages. Earliest Danian assemblages were characterized by the striking abundance of Classopollis, a pollen type linked to Casuarinaceae (Haloragacidites harrisii), the consistent presence of Beauprea (Peninsulapollis gillii), and ferns of Gleicheniaceae, among others.

=== Danian ===
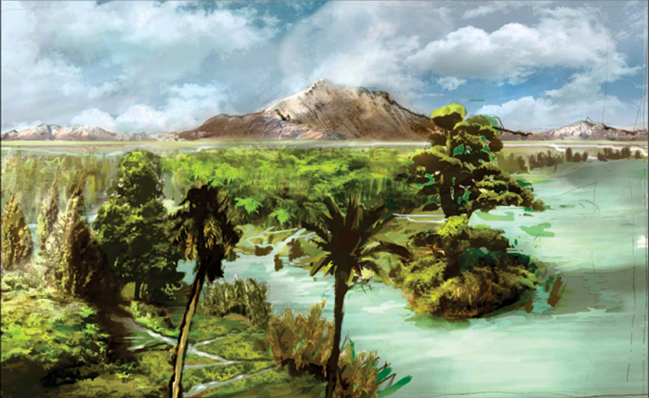
Reconstructed environment of the later Danian

Later Danian vegetation was dominated by gymnosperms, including diverse Podocarpaceae related to Podocarpus, Microcachrys, Dacrydium, Lagarostrobos and Dacrycarpus. Classopollis remained abundant, but it shows a general reduction towards younger samples. Palms and tree ferns of Dicksoniaceae were also important components of the Danian vegetation. Other elements included Nothofagus, diverse eudicots of uncertain affinity, and new species of Proteaceae and Ericaceae, indicating that several typical components of extant austral forests were in place by the Danian. Several Cretaceous taxa return again in this part of the sequence; including Liliaceae and temperate to warmer climate families: Aquifoliaceae, Malvaceae (Bombacoideae) and Arecaceae (Nypa type). The presence of Lactoridaceae, a monotypic family today restricted to subtropical forests of the Juan Fernández Archipelago, offshore Chile in the South Pacific Ocean, is particularly striking. These assemblages are fairly diverse, although no Danian sample reaches the diversity recorded in the latest Maastrichtian.

=== Fossil content ===
Fossils recovered from the formation include:

Age	Group	Fossils	Images	Notes
Danian	Mammals	Cocatherium lefipanum		
Danian	Fish	Hypolophodon patagoniensis		
Danian	Fish	Carcharias sp. teeth		
Danian	Gastropods	Turritella malaspina		
Danian	Bivalves	Meretrix chalcedonica		
Danian	Bivalves	Venericardia feruglioi		
Danian	Bivalves	Pycnodonte miradonensis		
Danian	Bivalves	Pseudolimea sp.		
Danian	Corals	Haimesiastraea conferta		
Danian	Microflora	Classopollis sp. (I), Haloragacidites harrisii (J), Proteacidites sp. (K), cf. Cicotriporites sp. (L), Neoraistrichia sp. (M), Senipites tercrassata (N), Retritricolporites sp. (O), Peninsulapollis gillii (P), Ulmoideipites patagonicus (Q), Bombacacidites cf. isoreticulatus (R), Rousea microreticulata (S), Nothofagidites dorotensis (T), Rosannia manika (U), Propylipollis reticuloscabratus (V), Ericipites microtectatum (W), Nothofagidites fuegiensis (X)		
Maastrichtian	Microflora	Grapnelispora evansii (A), Arecipites minutiscabratus (B), Lewalanipollis senectus (C), Liliacidites regularis (D), Longapertites aff. vaneendenburgi (E), Propylipollis ambiguus (F), Azollopsis tormentosa (G), Quadraplanus brossus (H)		
Maastrichtian	Plesiosaurs	Aristonectes parvidens		
Maastrichtian	Plesiosaurs	Tuarangisaurus keyesi		
Maastrichtian	Bivalves	Pterotrigonia windhausenia		
Maastrichtian	Macroflora	Lefipania padillae		
Maastrichtian	Macroflora	Araucaria lefipanensis		
Maastrichtian	Macroflora	Retrophyllum superstes		
Maastrichtian	Macroflora	Magnoliopsida		

== See also ==
- Guaduas Formation, contemporaneous fossiliferous formation of central Colombia
- Santa Lucía Formation, contemporaneous fossiliferous formation of Bolivia
- Yacoraite Formation, contemporaneous fossiliferous formation of the Salta Basin
- López de Bertodano Formation, contemporaneous fossiliferous formation of Antarctica
