= Cañadón Asfalto Basin =

Sedimentary basin in Argentina

- Cuenca de Cañadón Asfalto
- Location of the basin in Argentina
- Coordinates: 42°51′S 67°56′W
- Location: Southern South America
- Region: Patagonia
- Country: Argentina
- States: Chubut & Río Negro Provinces
- Cities: Gastre, Paso del Sapo

Characteristics
- On/Offshore: Onshore
- Boundaries: North Patagonian Massif (N & E), Cotricó High (S), Ñirihuau Basin (W)
- Part of: Southern Atlantic rift basins
- Area: ~80,000 km^{2} (31,000 sq mi)

Hydrology
- Rivers: Chico River, Chubut River
- Lakes: Gran Laguna Salada, Laguna del Hunco

Geology
- Basin type: Rift
- Plate: South American
- Orogeny: Opening of the South Atlantic (Mesozoic); Andean (Cenozoic)
- Age: Early Jurassic-Quaternary
- Stratigraphy: Stratigraphy

The Cañadón Asfalto Basin (Spanish: Cuenca de Cañadón Asfalto) is an irregularly shaped sedimentary basin located in north-central Patagonia, Argentina. The basin stretches from and partly covers the North Patagonian Massif in the north, a high forming the boundary of the basin with the Neuquén Basin in the northwest, to the Cotricó High in the south, separating the basin from the Golfo San Jorge Basin. It is located in the southern part of Río Negro Province and northern part of Chubut Province. The eastern boundary of the basin is the North Patagonian Massif separating it from the offshore Valdés Basin and it is bound in the west by the Patagonian Andes, separating it from the small Ñirihuau Basin.

The basin started forming in the Early Jurassic, with the break-up of Pangea and the creation of the South Atlantic, when extensional tectonics, including rifting, formed several basins in eastern South America and southwestern Africa. The accommodation space in the Cañadón Asfalto Basin was filled by volcanic, fluvial and lacustrine deposits in various geologic formations, separated by unconformities related to transtensional and transpressional tectonic forces. The Cenozoic evolution of the basin is mainly influenced by the Andean orogeny, producing folding and faulting in the basin.

The basin is of paleontological significance as it hosts several fossiliferous stratigraphic units providing many fossils of dinosaurs, turtles, mammals, plesiosaurs, pterosaurs, crocodylomorphs, fish, amphibians and flora in the Mesozoic and mammals, amphibians, fish and flora in the Cenozoic. The Collón Curá Formation, that is also present in the southern Neuquén Basin, is the defining formation for the Colloncuran, used within the SALMA classification, the geochronology for the Cenozoic used in South America.

== Description ==
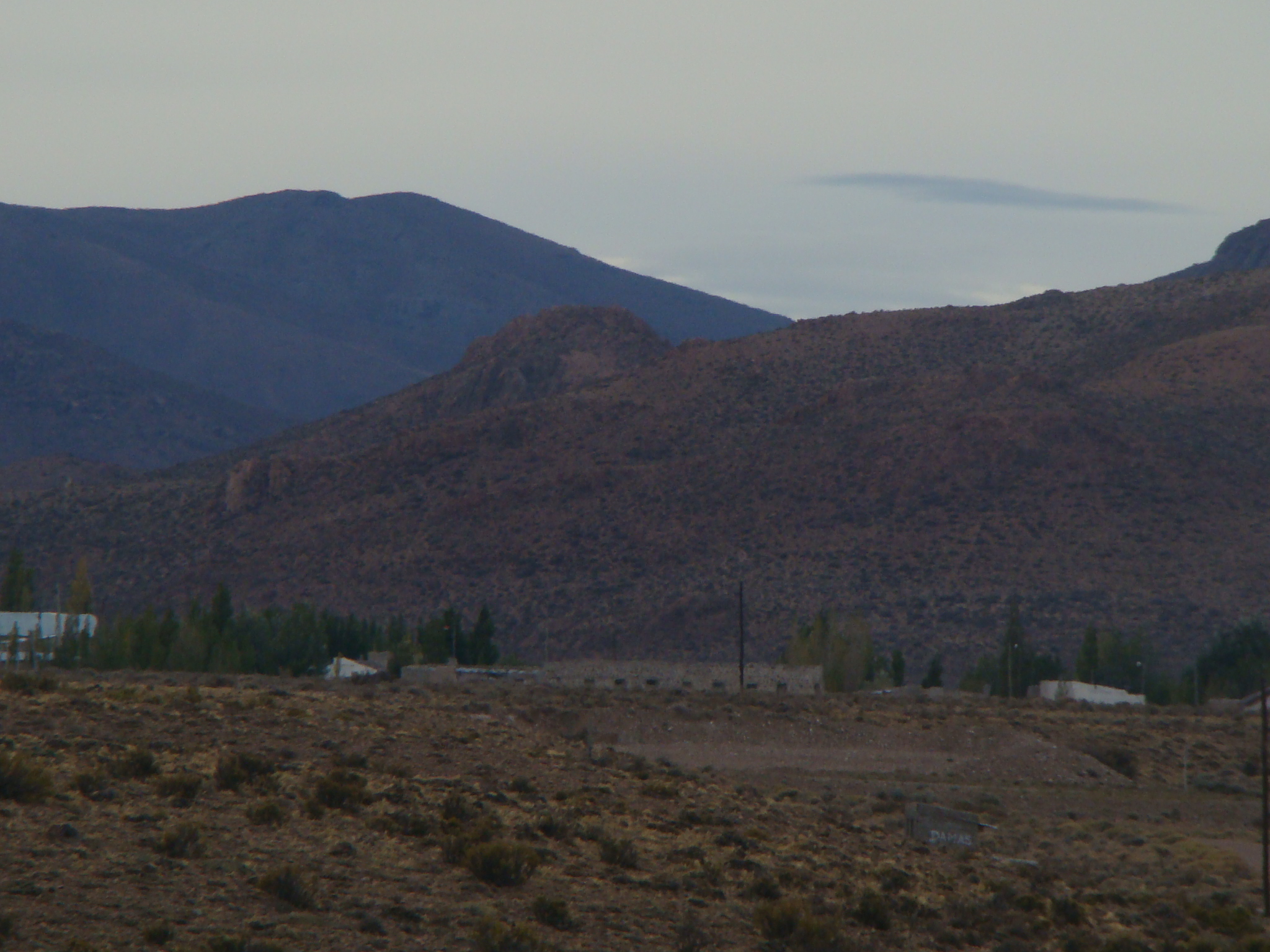
View of Gastre, in the center of the basin

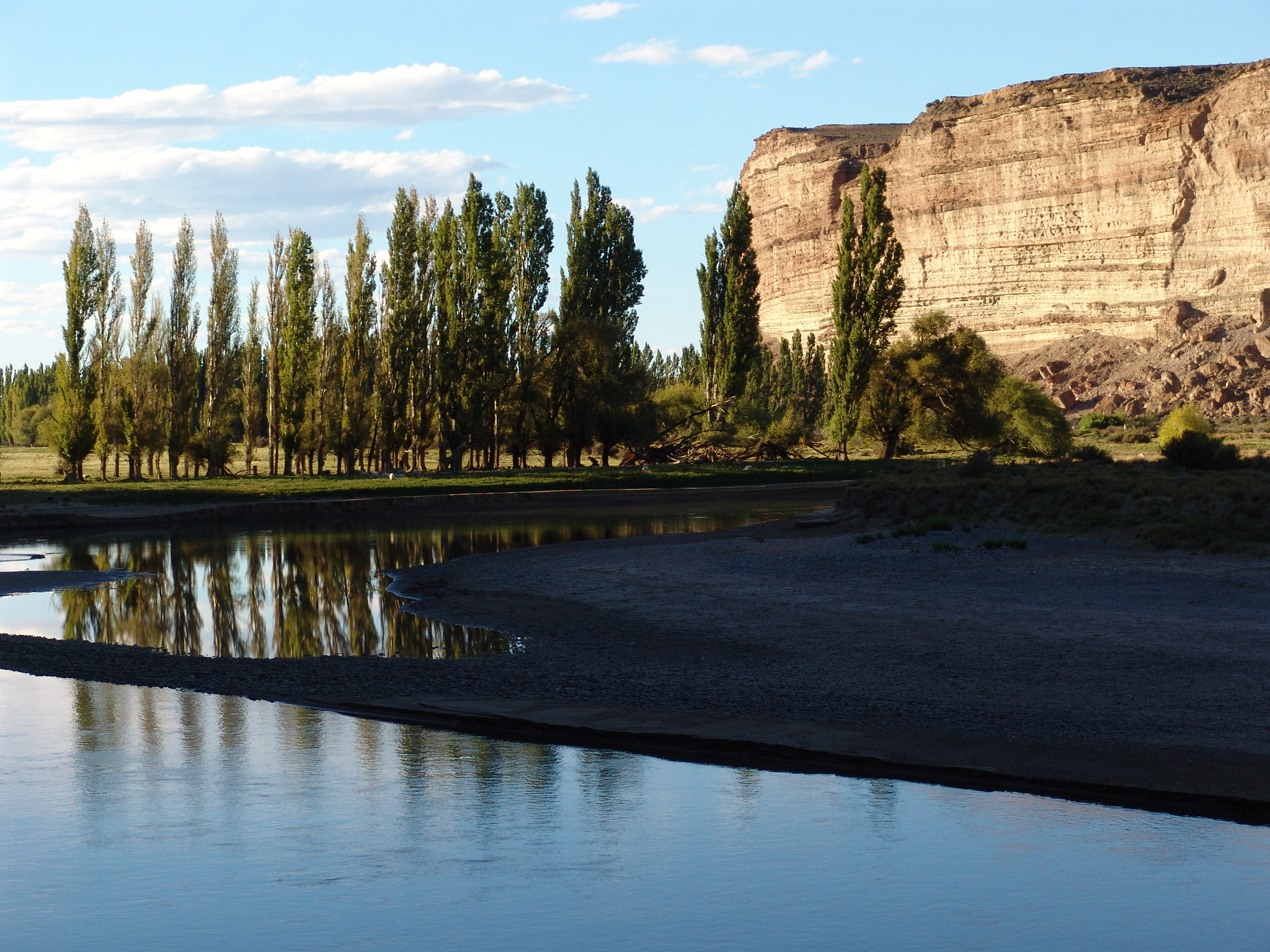
Altar Valley in the southern part of the basin, bounding the Chubut River

The Cañadón Asfalto Basin was not defined as a separate sedimentary basin until the 1990s. Until then, the sediments deposited in the basin were considered part of the North Patagonian Massif. Homovc et al. (1991) and Figari & Courtade (1993) started defining the stratigraphic units in megasequences indicative of the evolution of a rift basin, resulting from the break-up of Pangea and Gondwana in particular.

The basin has an irregular shape, comprising several depocenters defining sub-basins. The basin stretches from and partly covers the North Patagonian Massif in the north and east towards the Cotricó High to the south of the Paso del Sapo Sub-basin, separating the Cañadón Asfalto Basin from the Golfo San Jorge Basin in the south. In the west, the basin is bound by uplifted areas with the small Ñirihuau Basin.

The area of the basin is sparsely populated, with Gastre and Paso del Sapo representing some of the few villages in the basin. The Chubut River crosses the basin in the south in the Altar Valley.

=== Basin evolution ===
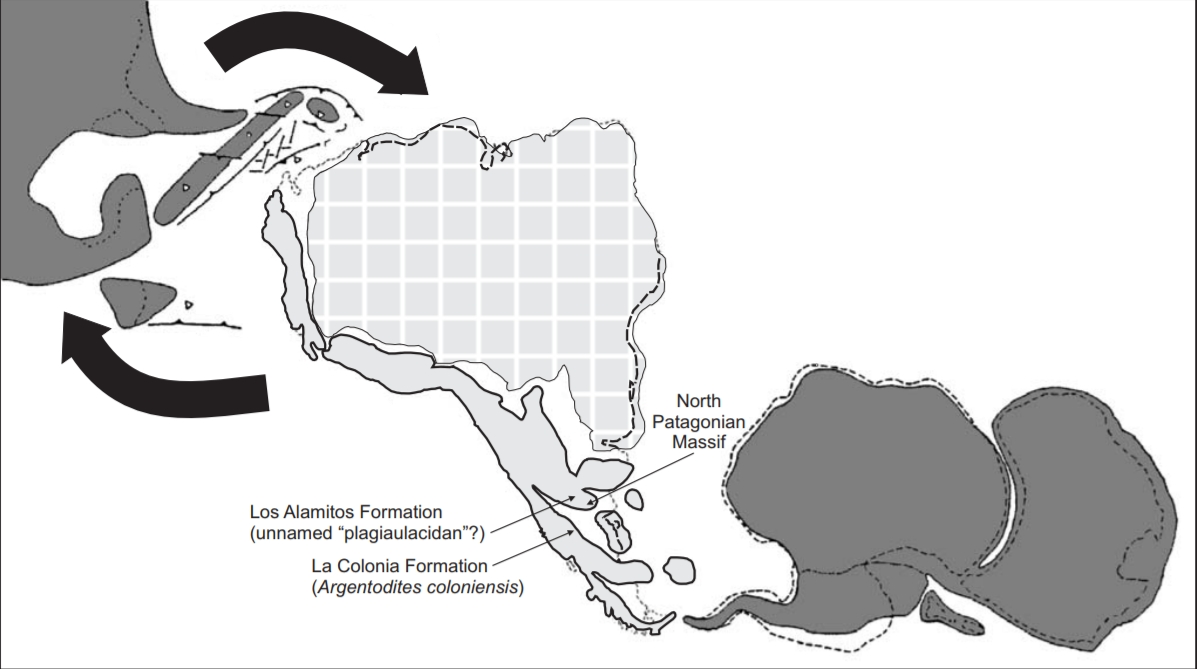
Sketch of the paleogeographic situation of South America during the Late Cretaceous and Early Paleogene, roughly 85 to 63 Ma. The Cañadón Asfalto Basin, located south of the North Patagonian Massif in the South Gondwanan Province (grey), is experiencing a marine transgression.

The Cañadón Asfalto Basin started forming in the earliest Jurassic on top of Permian basement constituted by the igneous-metamorphic Mamil Choique and Cushamen Formations. Two main phases of basin evolution are recognized; the Jurassic and Cretaceous megasequences. Figari et al. in 2015 describe two Jurassic megasequences, J1 in the Early Jurassic and J2 in the Late Jurassic. During these phases, the basin went through an extensional tectonic regime, with transtensional movements. Several distinct tectonic reactivation cycles occurred, with block rotation due to transpressional forces. The geodynamic movements are noted in the stratigraphy by regional unconformities. The predominantly extensional movement was overprinted by a compressional setting, active since the early Cenozoic. This compressional phase is noted in folds and compressional faults present in the basin.

The sedimentary infill of the Early and Middle Jurassic in the basin is characterized by fluvial and lacustrine sediments of the Las Leoneras, Cañadón Asfalto and Cañadón Calcáreo Formations covering the volcanic Lonco Trapial Formation, which comprises intermediate volcanic rocks sourced by magmas coming from the mantle. This succession is unconformably covered by lacustrine, fluvial and volcaniclastic rocks of the approximately 10 to 15 million year ranging Chubut Group comprising the older Los Adobes Formation and the younger Cerro Barcino Formation. The western side of the basin during the Late Cretaceous experienced a marine transgression of the Atlantic Ocean, depositing the fluvial and estuarine Paso del Sapo and Lefipán Formations.

The marine sediments of the Lefipán Formations have been correlated to the Salamanca Formation of the Golfo San Jorge Basin to the south and the Lefipán sediments were sourced from the North Patagonian Massif. To the west of the Cañadón Asfalto Basin, another basin started forming in these times, the Ñirihuau Basin, characterized by the deposition of the felsic to intermediate volcanic Don Juan Formation, the basaltic Tres Picos Prieto Formation and the Huitrera Formation. In the Ñirihuau Basin, this sequence is covered by the Oligocene to Miocene Ventana Formation.

During the Paleogene, in the Cañadón Asfalto Basin the volcaniclastic Laguna del Hunco Formation, and volcanic Sarmiento Group were deposited. The Neogene succession in the basin comprises the Early Miocene alluvial volcaniclastics of the La Pava Formation, and the Middle to Late Miocene volcaniclastic, fluvial, lacustrine and deltaic tuffs, sandstones and carbonates of the Collón Curá Formation.

The Late Miocene to Quaternary succession comprises mostly the basaltic lava flows of the El Mirador Formation, the basalts of the Cráter Formation, and Quaternary alluvium. In the northern part of the basin, the Late Miocene and Early Pliocene is represented by the fluvial, marine and eolian Río Negro Formation, a formation extending into the Colorado Basin.

== Stratigraphy ==
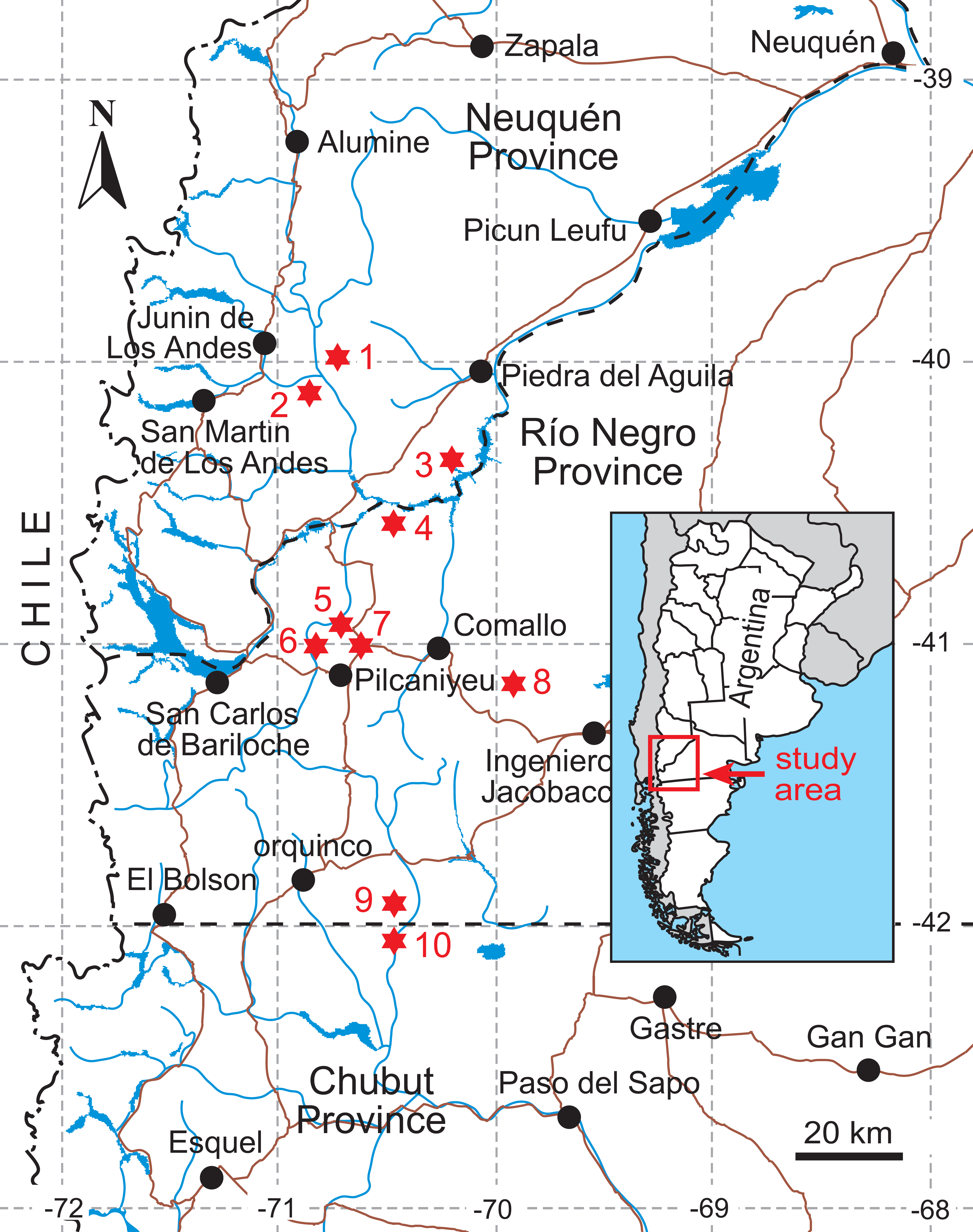
Outcrops of the Collón Curá Formation in the basin (9 & 10)

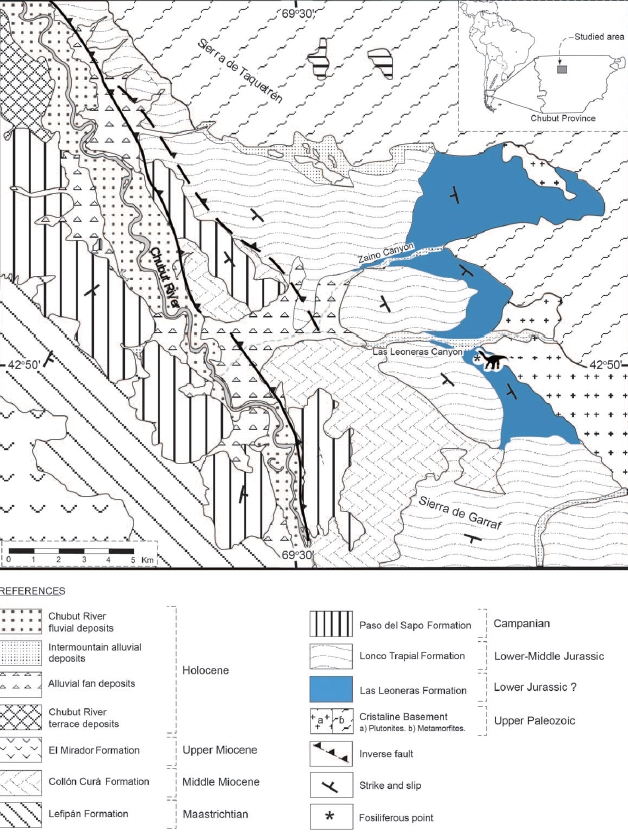
Outcrops of the Las Leoneras and other formations

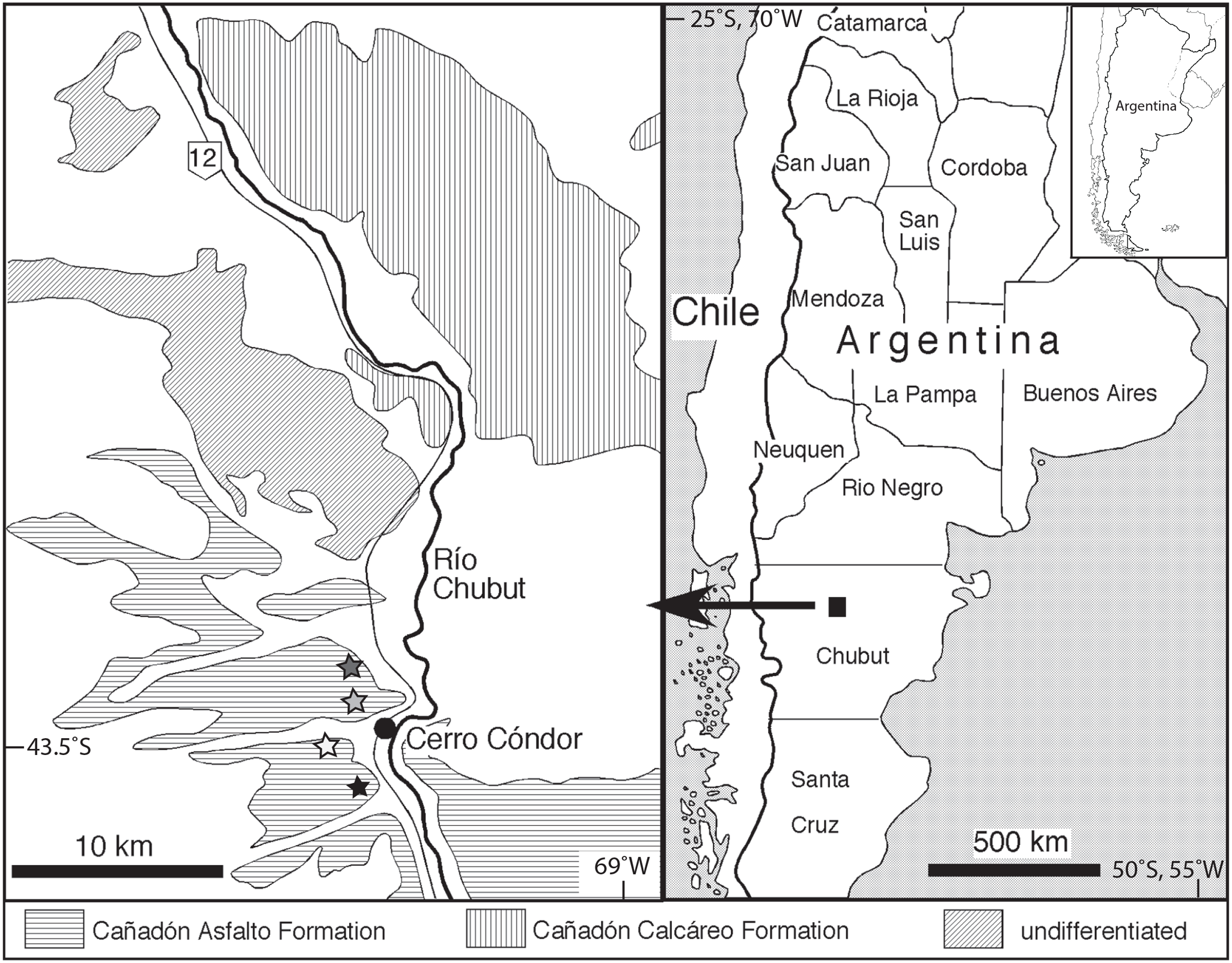
Outcrop areas of the Cañadón Asfalto and Calcáreo Formations

The stratigraphy of the Cañadón Asfalto Basin covers the following units:

Age	Group	Formation	Sequence	Environment	Maximum thickness	Notes
Quaternary	alluvium					
Mid-Late Pleistocene		Cráter		Basalt	3 m (9.8 ft)	
Early Pliocene		Río Negro		Eolian, fluvial & marine		
Late Miocene		Río Negro		Eolian, fluvial & marine		
Late Miocene		El Mirador		Volcanic		
Colloncuran		Collón Curá		Fluvial, lacustrine, deltaic	300 m (980 ft)	
Early Miocene		La Pava		Alluvial volcaniclastic	15 m (49 ft)	
Early Miocene	Sarmiento			Volcanic		
Late Eocene	Sarmiento			Volcanic		
Early Eocene		Laguna del Hunco		Volcaniclastic		
Late Paleocene	Hiatus					
Danian		Barda Colorada		Volcaniclastic		
Danian		Lefipán		Tidal & shallow marine	380 m (1,250 ft)	
Maastrichtian		Lefipán				
Maastrichtian		La Colonia		Tidal & shallow marine	240 m (790 ft)	
Maastrichtian		Paso del Sapo		Estuarine & shallow marine	150 m (490 ft)	
Campanian		Paso del Sapo		Estuarine & shallow marine	150 m (490 ft)	
Santonian	Hiatus					
Coniacian	Hiatus					
Turonian	Hiatus					
Cenomanian	Hiatus					
Albian	Chubut	Cerro Barcino	K	Fluvial, alluvial, lacustrine		
Aptian	Chubut	Cerro Barcino	K	Fluvial, alluvial, lacustrine		
Barremian	Chubut	Los Adobes	K	Alluvial & fluvial		
Hauterivian	Hiatus					
Valanginian	Hiatus					
Berriasian	Hiatus					
Tithonian	Sierra de Olte	Cañadón Calcáreo	J2	Fluvial & lacustrine		
Kimmeridgian	Sierra de Olte	Cañadón Calcáreo	J2	Fluvial & lacustrine		
Oxfordian	Sierra de Olte	Cañadón Calcáreo	J2	Fluvial & lacustrine		
Callovian	Sierra de Olte	Hiatus				
Bathonian	Sierra de Olte	Hiatus				
Bajocian	Sierra de Olte	Cañadón Asfalto	J1	Lacustrine carbonate platform	600 m (2,000 ft)	
Aalenian	Sierra de Olte	Cañadón Asfalto	J1	Lacustrine carbonate platform	600 m (2,000 ft)	
Toarcian	Sierra de Olte	Cañadón Asfalto	J1	Lacustrine carbonate platform	600 m (2,000 ft)	
Toarcian		Lonco Trapial	J1	Volcaniclastic	800 m (2,600 ft)	
Pliensbachian		Lonco Trapial	J1	Volcaniclastic	800 m (2,600 ft)	
Sinemurian		Lonco Trapial	J1	Volcaniclastic	800 m (2,600 ft)	
Hettangian		Las Leoneras	J1	Fluvial & lacustrine	372 m (1,220 ft)	
Triassic	Hiatus					
Paleozoic	Basement	Mamil Choique & Cushamen				

== Paleontological significance ==
The Cañadón Asfalto Basin has provided several fossils of various groups of flora and fauna. One of the largest dinosaurs known, the titanosaur Patagotitan mayorum, and one of the largest theropods, Tyrannotitan chubutensis, were found in the Cerro Barcino Formation. Fossils of Leonerasaurus taquetrensis, an early Sauropodomorph, were found in and named after the Las Leoneras Formation. The La Colonia Formation has provided fossils of a mammal; Argentodites coloniensis, and a nearly complete skeleton of the theropod Carnotaurus sastrei. Remains of the plesiosaur Aristonectes parvidens were found in the Maastrichtian section of the Lefipán Formation.

Fossil flora (pollen, spores, algae and macroflora) have been recovered from the Lonco Trapial Formation (Cupressaceae), and the Cañadón Asfalto Formation and comprise several families of plants, indicative of climatic conditions in the Late Jurassic; Osmundaceae, Caytoniaceae, Araucariaceae, Cheirolepidiaceae, Podocarpaceae, Botryococcaceae, Zygnemataceae, Prasinophyceae, Filicales and Taxodiaceae. The same formation also provided fossils of two species of the frog Notobatrachus, the turtle Condorchelys antiqua, the pterosaur Allkaruen koi, and several mammals.

Fossil fish of Condorlepis groeberi were retrieved from the Cañadón Calcáreo Formation, and the crocodylomorphs Almadasuchus figarii (Cañadón Calcáreo Formation), and Barcinosuchus gradilis (Cerro Barcino Formation), come from the Mesozoic strata in the basin.

Fossil leaves of Lefipania padillae and Araucaria lefipanensis come from and were named after the latest Maastrichtian within the Lefipán Formation. The Paleocene (Tiupampan) strata of the Lefipán Formation have provided fossils of the mammal Cocatherium lefipanum and fish Hypolophodon patagoniensis.

The Early Eocene (Casamayoran to Mustersan) Laguna del Hunco Formation has provided fossils of the fish Bachmannia chubutensis, the frog Shelania pascuali, and fossil flora.

The Collón Curá Formation, that defines the Colloncuran South American land mammal age, stretches across the Neuquén Basin to the northwest of the North Patagonian Massif and the western part of the Cañadón Asfalto Basin. The formation has provided many mammal, reptile and bird fossils, among which the largest terror bird Kelenken. Along the Chico River in the basin (localities 9 and 10 on the map), fossils of the sparassodont Patagosmilus goini, two new species of Protypotherium, and the rodents Guiomys unica and Microcardiodon williensis were found.

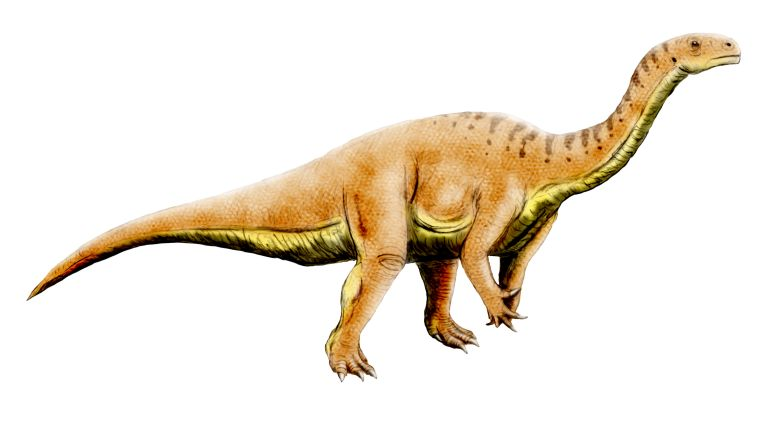
Leonerasaurus

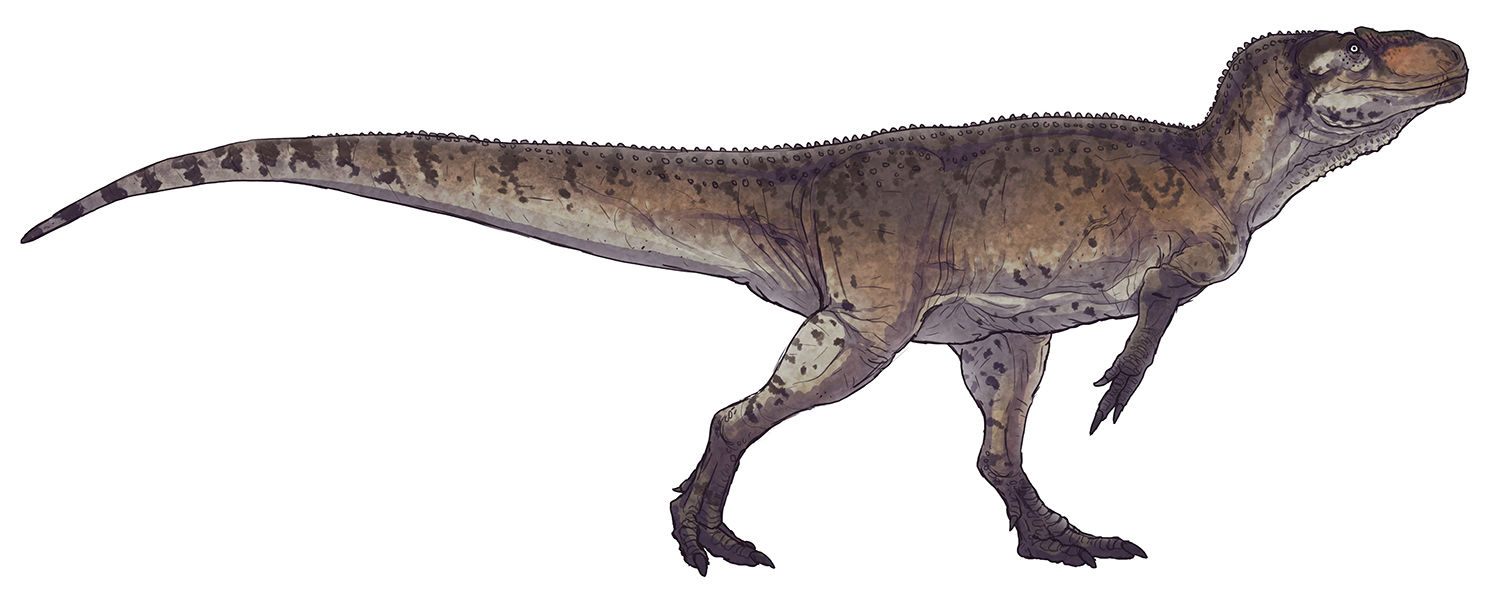
Piatnitzkysaurus

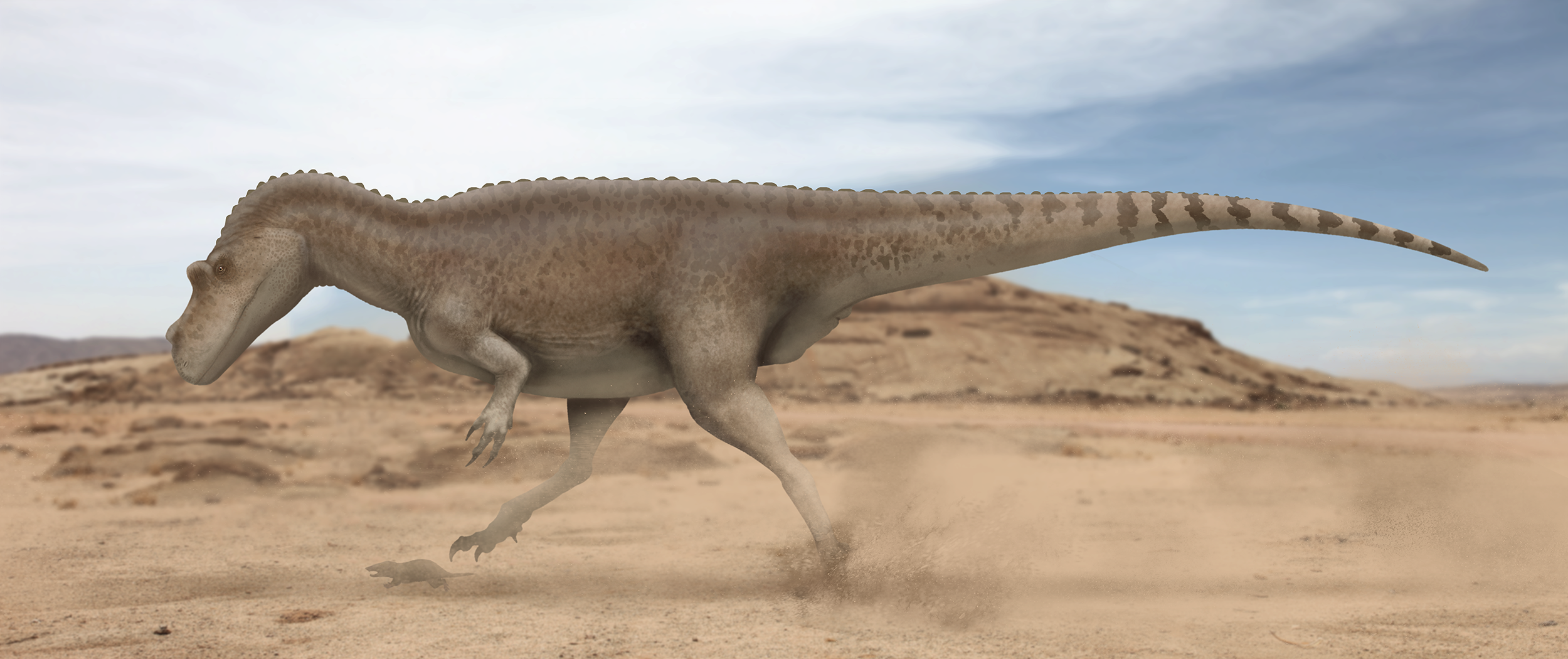
Genyodectes

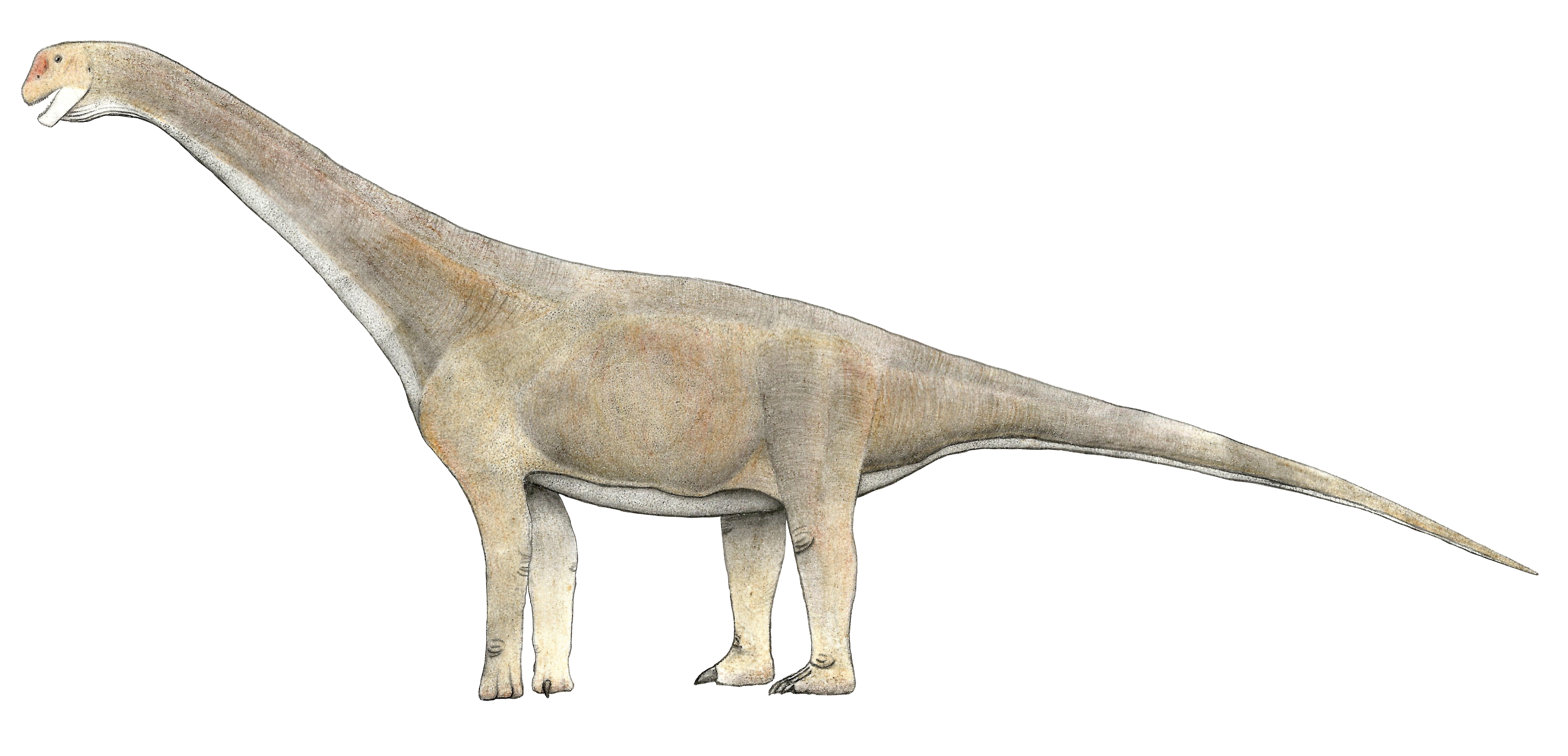
Tehuelchesaurus

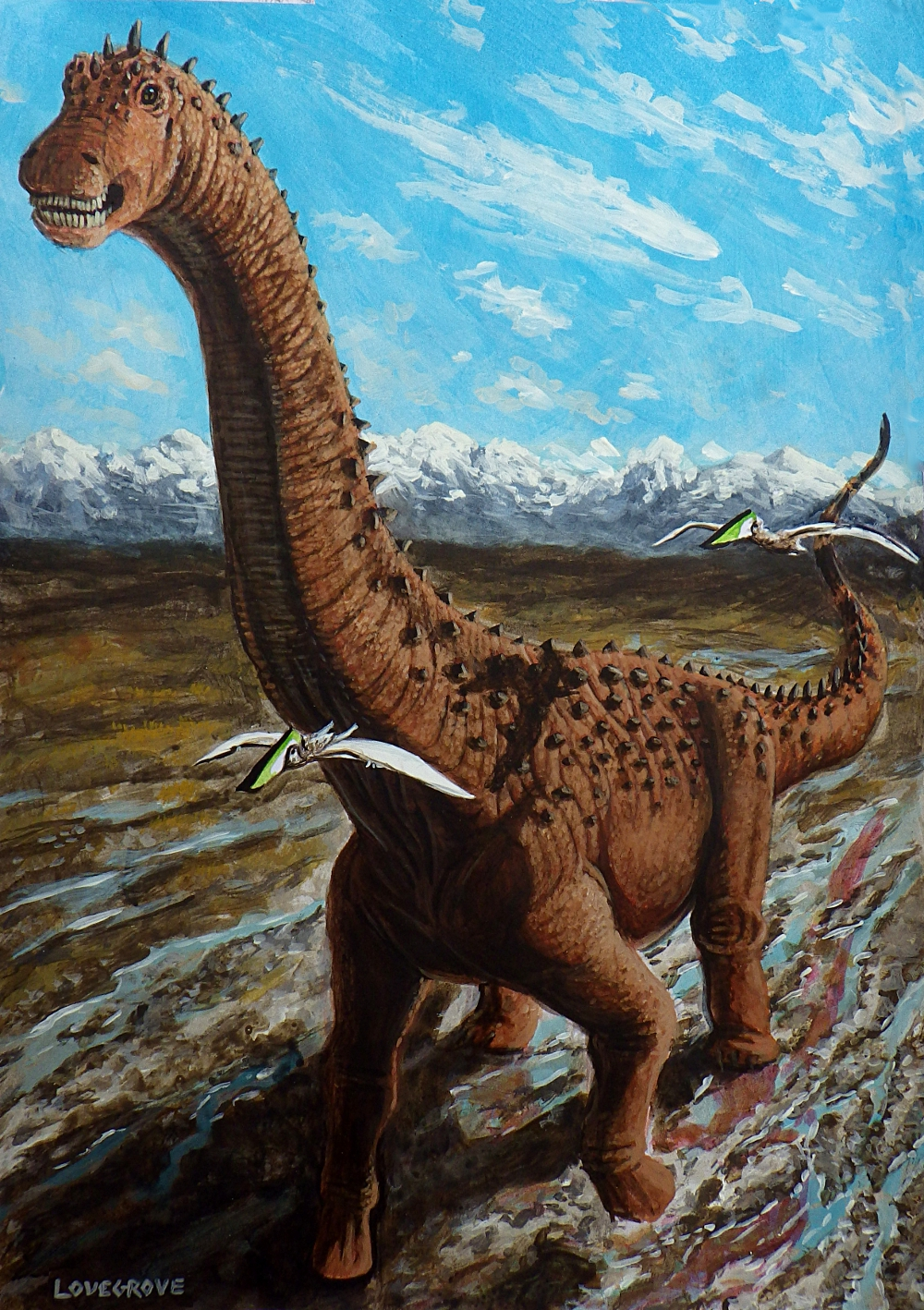
Patagotitan
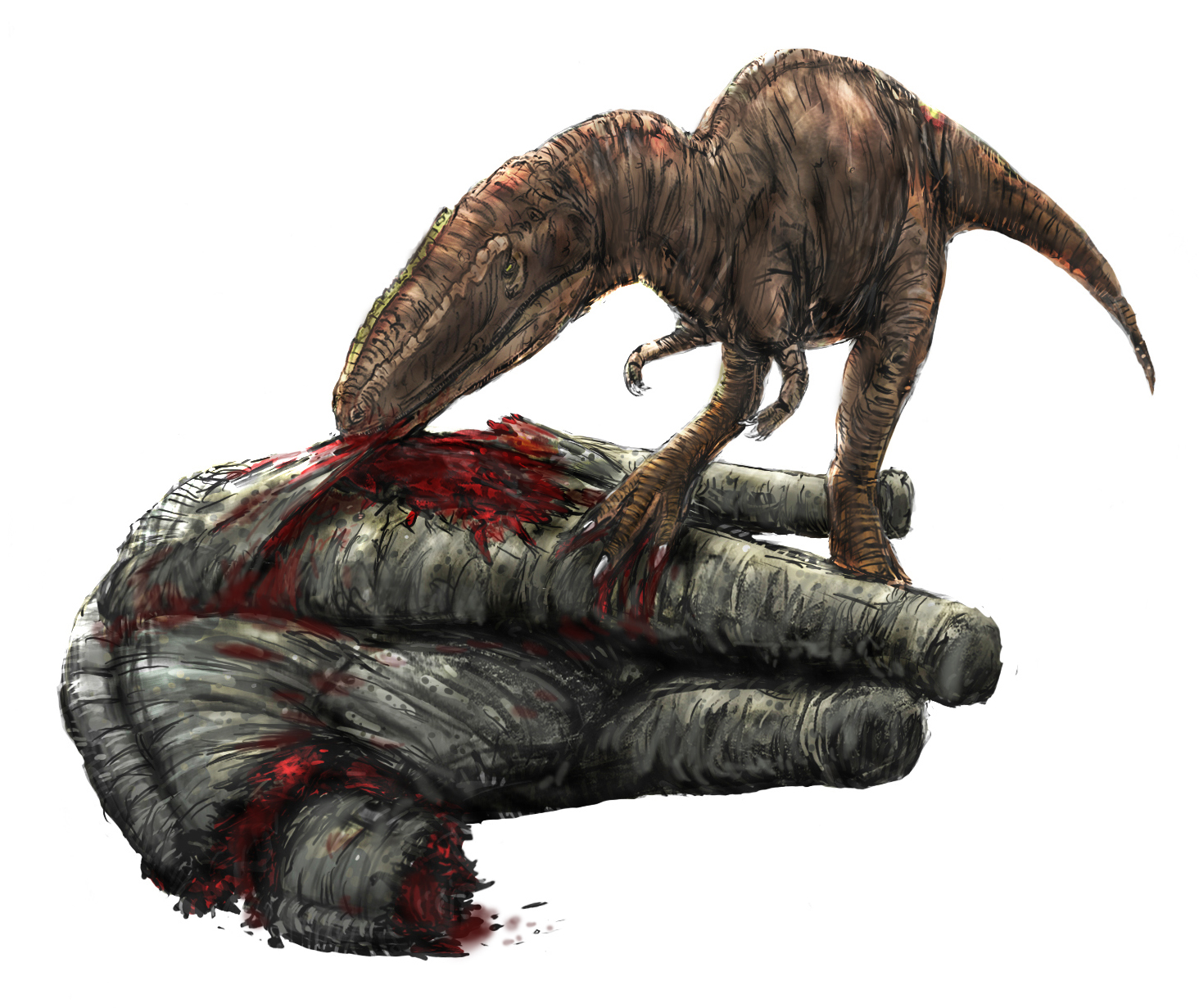
Tyrannotitan & Chubutisaurus

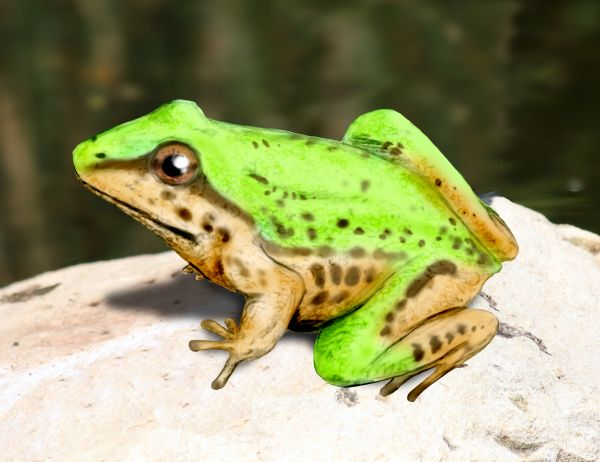
Notobatrachus

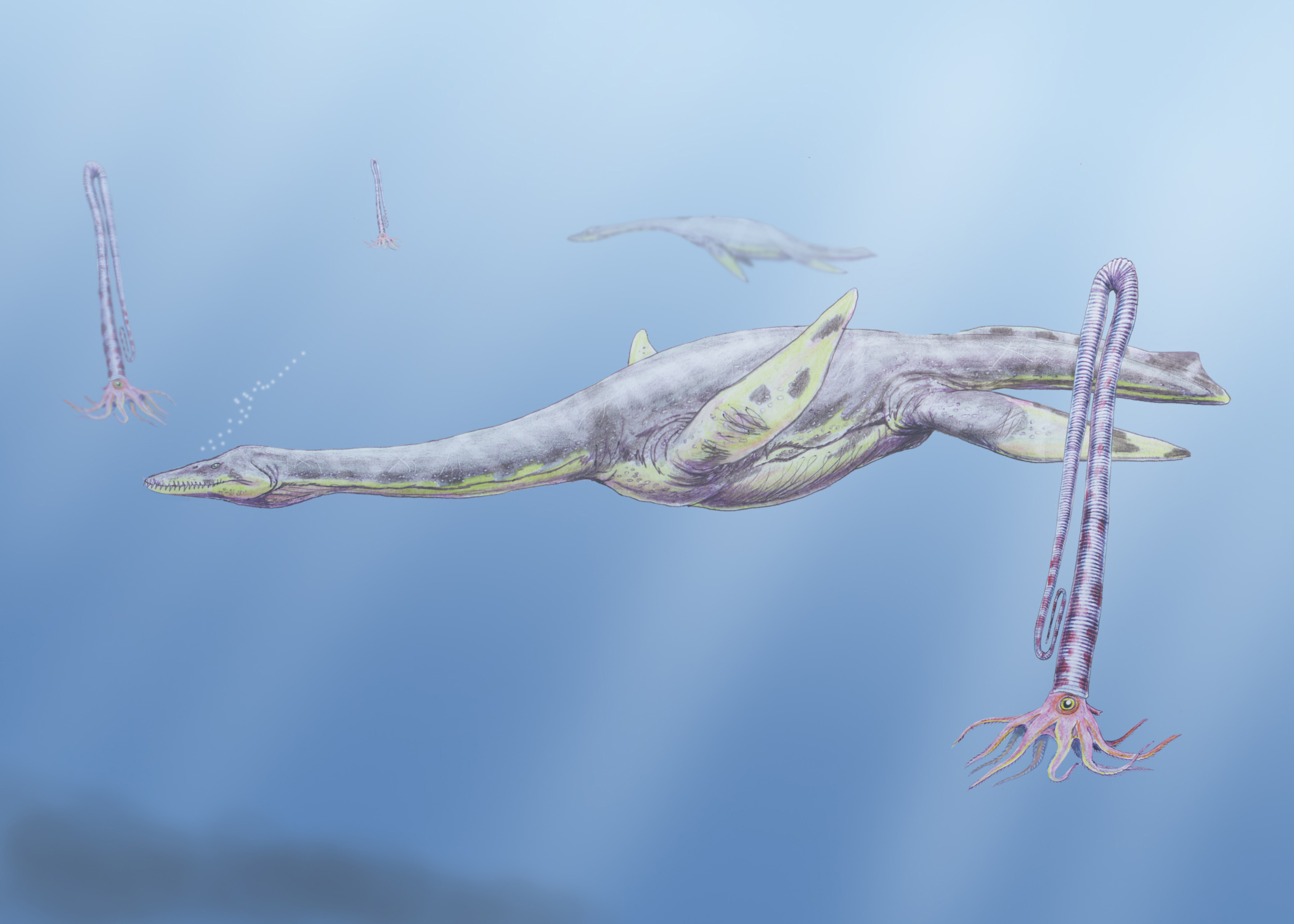
Aristonectes

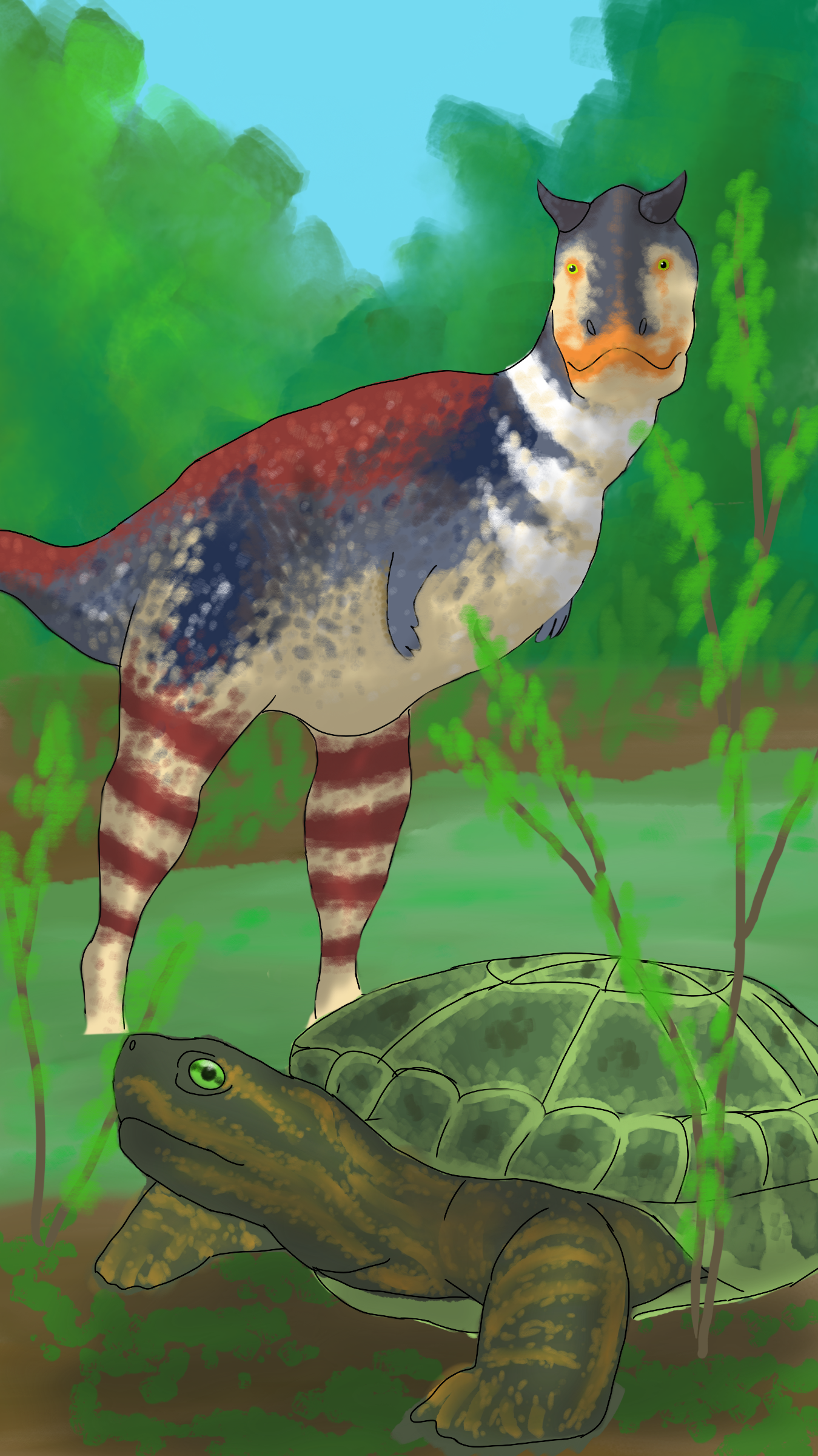
Carnotaurus & Patagoniaemys

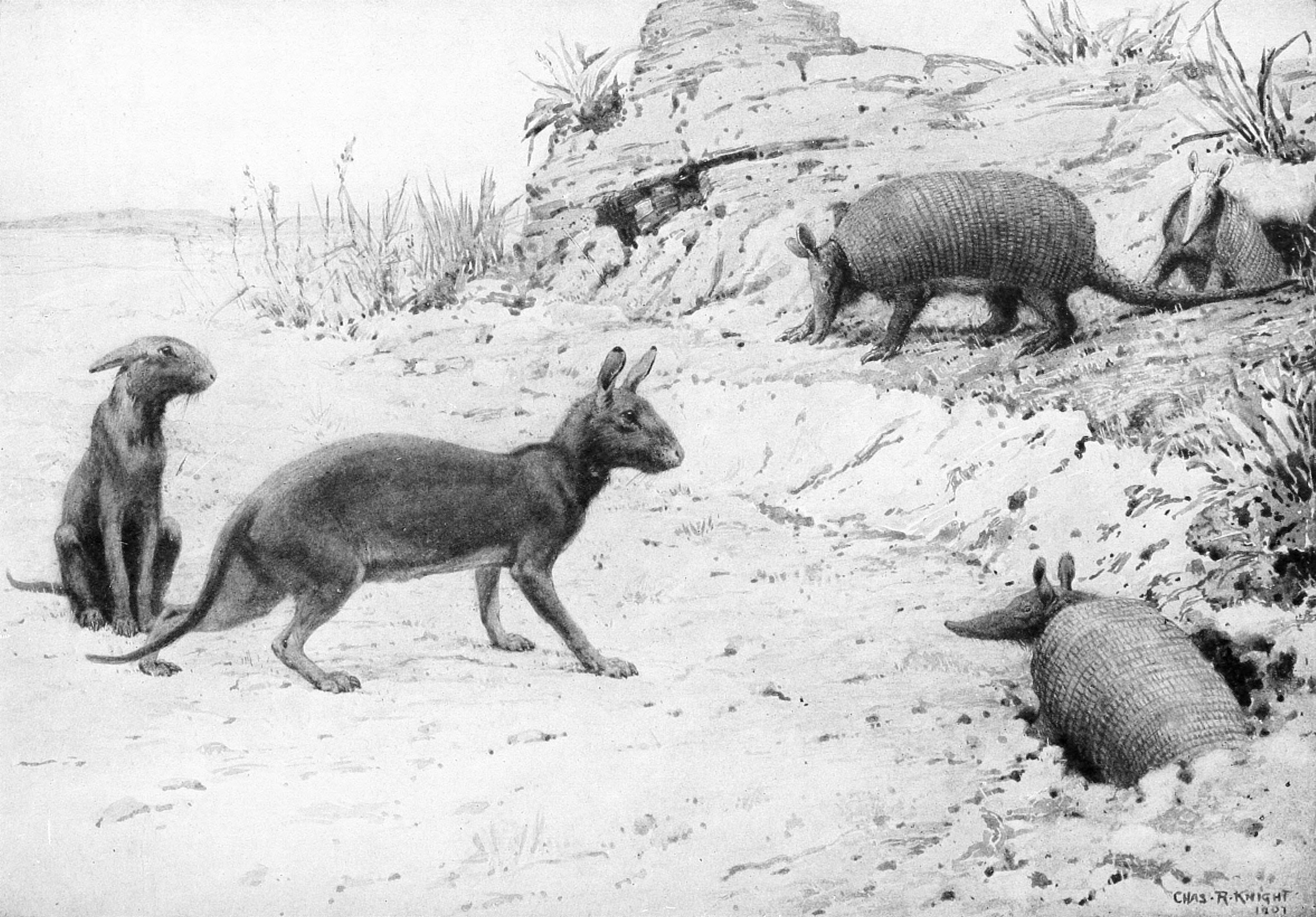
Protypotherium & Stegotherium

== See also ==
- Austral Basin
- Cuyo Basin
- Paraná Basin
- Salta Basin
- Santos Basin
