= Los Adobes Formation =

Argentinian geologic formation

- Stratigraphic range: Aptian; ~118–114 Ma
- Type: Geological formation
- Unit of: Chubut Group
- Sub-units: Bardas Coloradas member
- Underlies: Cerro Barcino Formation
- Overlies: Cañadón Calcáreo Formation (generally); Paso del Sapo Formation (Sierra de Traquetrén)
- Thickness: Up to 700 m (2,300 ft)

Lithology
- Primary: Mudstone, sandstone
- Other: Conglomerate

Location
- Coordinates: 43.2°S 69.1°W
- Approximate paleocoordinates: 44.1°S 35.6°W
- Region: Chubut Province
- Country: Argentina
- Extent: Cañadón Asfalto Basin

Type section
- Named by: Tasch & Volkheimer
- Year defined: 1970
- Los Adobes Formation (Argentina)

Los Adobes Formation is an Early Cretaceous (Aptian) geologic formation in Chubut Province, in the Cañadón Asfalto Basin of central Patagonia, Argentina. The formation belongs to the Chubut Group and represents the Early Cretaceous K1 megasequence in the basin, unconformably overlying the Late Jurassic Cañadón Calcáreo Formation and is overlain by the Albian Cerro Barcino Formation.

Los Adobes Formation was deposited in an alluvial to fluvial environment and the mudstones of the overall sandy and conglomeratic unit have provided fossils of a chelid turtle whose indeterminate remains were described by Sterli et al. in 2020.

== Description ==
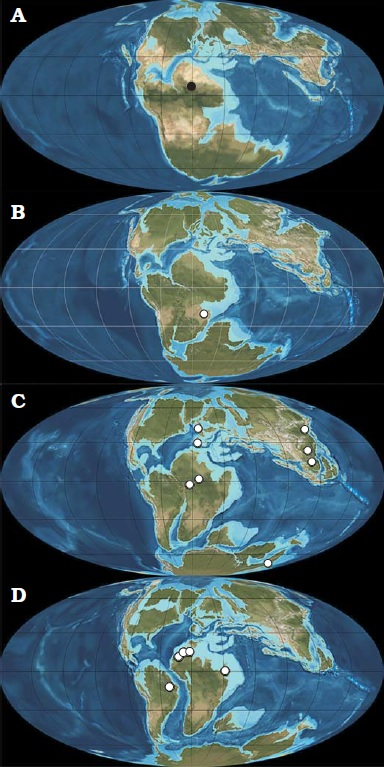
Paleogeographic evolution with Barremian-Aptian (C)

Los Adobes Formation, the lower unit in the Chubut Group was first described in 1970 by Tasch and Volkheimer. The formation underlies the Cerro Barcino Formation and unconformably overlies the Late Jurassic Cañadón Calcáreo Formation. The formation crops out in the southern Cañadón Asfalto Basin, south of the North Patagonian Massif until the Meseta de Canquel.

In the Sierra de Traquetrén, in the extreme northwest of the Cañadón Asfalto Basin, Los Adobes Formation has been thrusted onto the Maastrichtian Paso del Sapo Formation.

The formation is absent in the Cañadón del Zaino around Cerro Baya and Gastre, where the Early Jurassic Las Leoneras and Lonco Trapial Formations as well as the Middle Jurassic Cañadón Asfalto Formation crop out. The oldest overlying formations in this area are the Neogene La Pava and Cráter Formations.

=== Geologic framework ===
During the late Early Cretaceous, the Cañadón Asfalto Basin was a back-arc basin with thinned underlying crust. The subduction of the Chasca and Catequil Plates, forerunners of the Farallones Plate, caused volcanic activity in the present Andean terrain represented by the Divisadero Group in Chile. Los Adobes Formation represents the K1 megasequence in the basin history, following the Jurassic megasequences when the depocenter of the basin was deeper.

=== Lithology and depositional environment ===
The formation comprises mudstones, sandstones and conglomerates, deposited in a terrestrial alluvial to fluvial environment. Paleocurrent analysis of the sediments suggest a transport direction towards the south and east. Los Adobes Formation is correlated with the Pozo D-129 Formation of the Golfo San Jorge Basin to the south. The basal part of Los Adobes Formation is irregular, covering the Jurassic sediments in small depocenters. The maximum noted thickness is 700 metres (2,300 ft). The formation shows progressive unconformities that show up in seismic sections as onlap structures.

=== Age ===
U-Pb dating of the formation has provided ages ranging from 118 to 114 Ma. At this time, during the Aptian extinction events (~117-116 Ma) and the opening of the South Atlantic, the Neuquén Basin to the northwest was experiencing the Middle Mirano unconformity, dated at 117 Ma and separating the contemporaneous Huitrín Formation.

== Fossil content ==
The formation has provided fossils of an inderminate chelid turtle.

== See also ==
- Aptian formations
- Paja Formation, contemporaneous fossiliferous formation of the Altiplano Cundiboyacense, Colombia
- Caiuá Formation, contemporaneous fossiliferous formation of the Paraná Basin, Brazil
- Crato Formation, contemporaneous fossiliferous formation of the Araripe Basin, Brazil
- Agrio and La Amarga and Lohan Cura Formations, contemporaneous fossiliferous formations of the Neuquén Basin
- Río Belgrano Formations, contemporaneous fossiliferous formation of the Magallanes or Austral Basin
