= Bicharracosaurus =

Bicharracosaurus Temporal range: Late Jurassic, 157.4 Ma
- Silhouette with known material of B. dionidei indicated

Scientific classification
- Kingdom: Animalia
- Phylum: Chordata
- Class: Reptilia
- Clade: Dinosauria
- Clade: Saurischia
- Clade: †Sauropodomorpha
- Clade: †Sauropoda
- Clade: †Macronaria
- Genus: †Bicharracosaurus; Reutter et al., 2026

Type species
- †Bicharracosaurus dionidei Reutter et al., 2026

Extinct genus of dinosaurs

Bicharracosaurus (lit. 'big animal lizard') is a genus of macronarian sauropod dinosaur, possibly a brachiosaurid, known from the Late Jurassic Cañadón Calcáreo Formation of Argentina. The genus contains a single species, Bicharracosaurus dionidei.

== Discovery and naming ==
Geographical map showing the type locality (a), Geographical map showing the type locality within Cañadón Calcáreo Formation (b), the photograph of the quarry map (c) and the sketch of the quarry map (d) of Bicharracosaurus

The type specimen of Bicharracosaurus dionidei, MPEF-PV 1730, was discovered in Chubut Province, Argentina, in the central part of the outcrop area near the Chubut River. It was reported by a local farmer, Dionide Mesa, in March 2001. The excavation of the site began in 2002. Most of the specimen was excavated by 2011, though more cervical vertebrae were excavated in 2018. The specimen consists of a partial skeleton, which contains disarticulated caudal vertebrae, articulated cervical and dorsal vertebrae, with ribs, sacral vertebrae, and an ilium.

In 2026, Alexandra Reutter and colleagues described Bicharracosaurus dionidei as a new genus and species of macronarian sauropod based on these fossil remains, establishing MPEF-PV 1730 as the holotype specimen. The generic name, Bicharracosaurus, combines the informal Spanish word bicharraco, meaning 'big animal'—in reference to its huge size—and the Latinised Greek word saurus, meaning 'lizard'. The specific name, dionidei, is after the farmer Dionide Mesa who found this specimen.

== Description ==
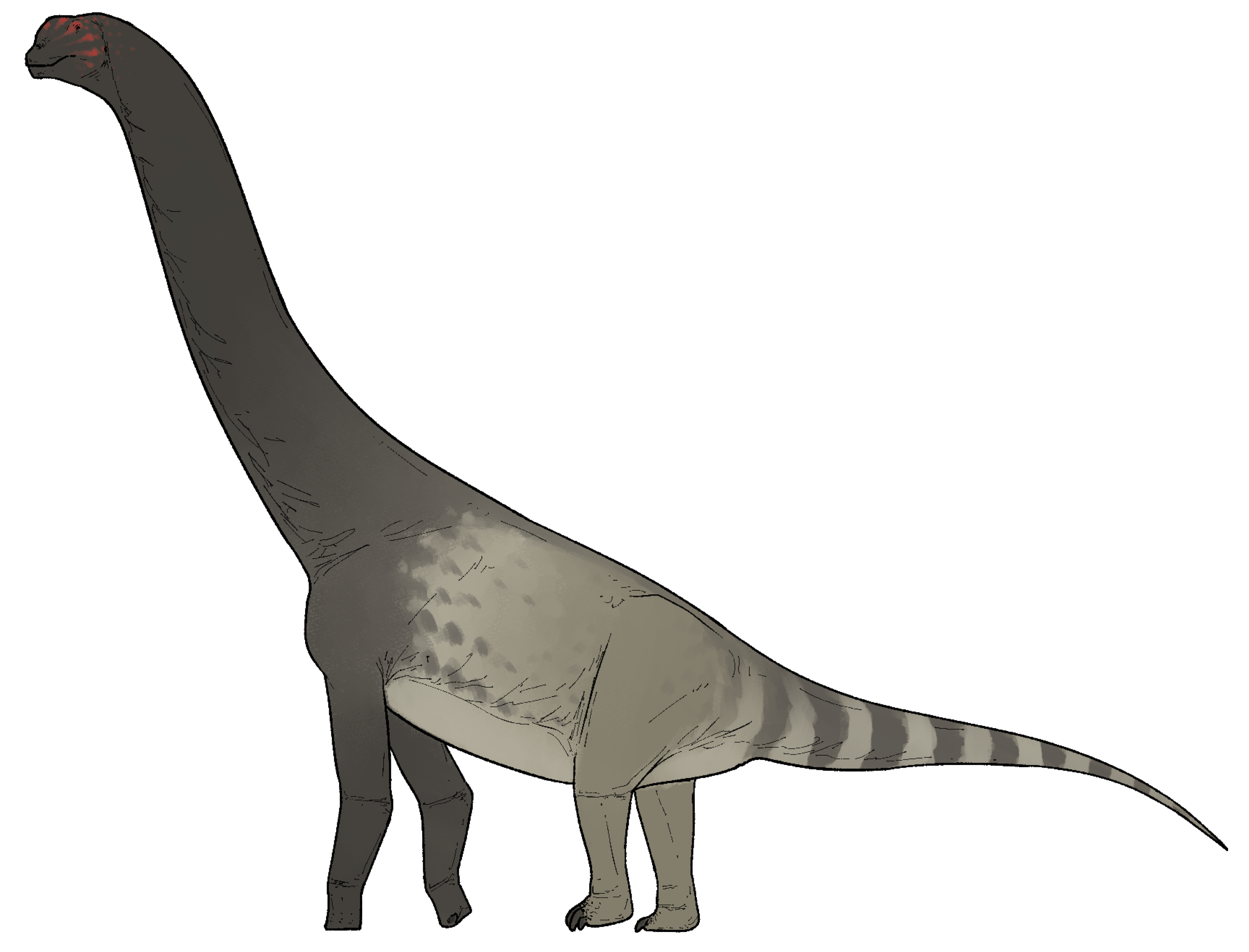
Life restoration

Bicharracosaurus had an estimated length of 15 metres (49 ft) and a weight of 20 tonnes (44,000 lb). Several distinguishing traits were established. Three of these are autapomorphies, unique derived characters. In the middle and rear tail vertebrae, the centrodiapophyseal fossa is pierced by a triangular pneumatic hole. With the rearmost neck vertebrae, the postzygodiapophyseal lamina at its lower end has a small upwardly directed protuberance. The centra of the sacral vertebrae have boat-shaped joint facets.
