= Cañadón Calcáreo Formation =

Geologic formation in Argentina

- Stratigraphic range: Oxfordian-Tithonian; ~160–150 Ma
- Type: Geological formation
- Unit of: Sierra de Olte Group
- Underlies: Los Adobes Formation
- Overlies: Cañadón Asfalto Formation

Lithology
- Primary: Sandstone
- Other: Shale, tuffite

Location
- Location: Patagonia
- Coordinates: 43.2°S 69.1°W
- Approximate paleocoordinates: 40.6°S 30.0°W
- Region: Chubut Province
- Country: Argentina
- Extent: Cañadón Asfalto Basin
- Cañadón Calcáreo Formation (Argentina)

The Cañadón Calcáreo Formation is an Oxfordian to Kimmeridgian-aged geologic formation, from the Cañadón Asfalto Basin in Chubut Province, Argentina, a rift basin that started forming since the earliest Jurassic. It was formerly thought to date into the Cretaceous, but the age has been revised with Uranium–lead dating as likely being solely Late Jurassic in age.

It is a subunit of the Sierra de Olte Group, close to the city Cerro Condor in the Chubut Province of northwestern Patagonia, in southern Argentina. The formation is composed primarily of fluvial sandstones alongside shales and volcanic tuffites

The formation preserves fishes, crocodylomorphs and some dinosaur taxa, as well as conifers.

== Geology ==
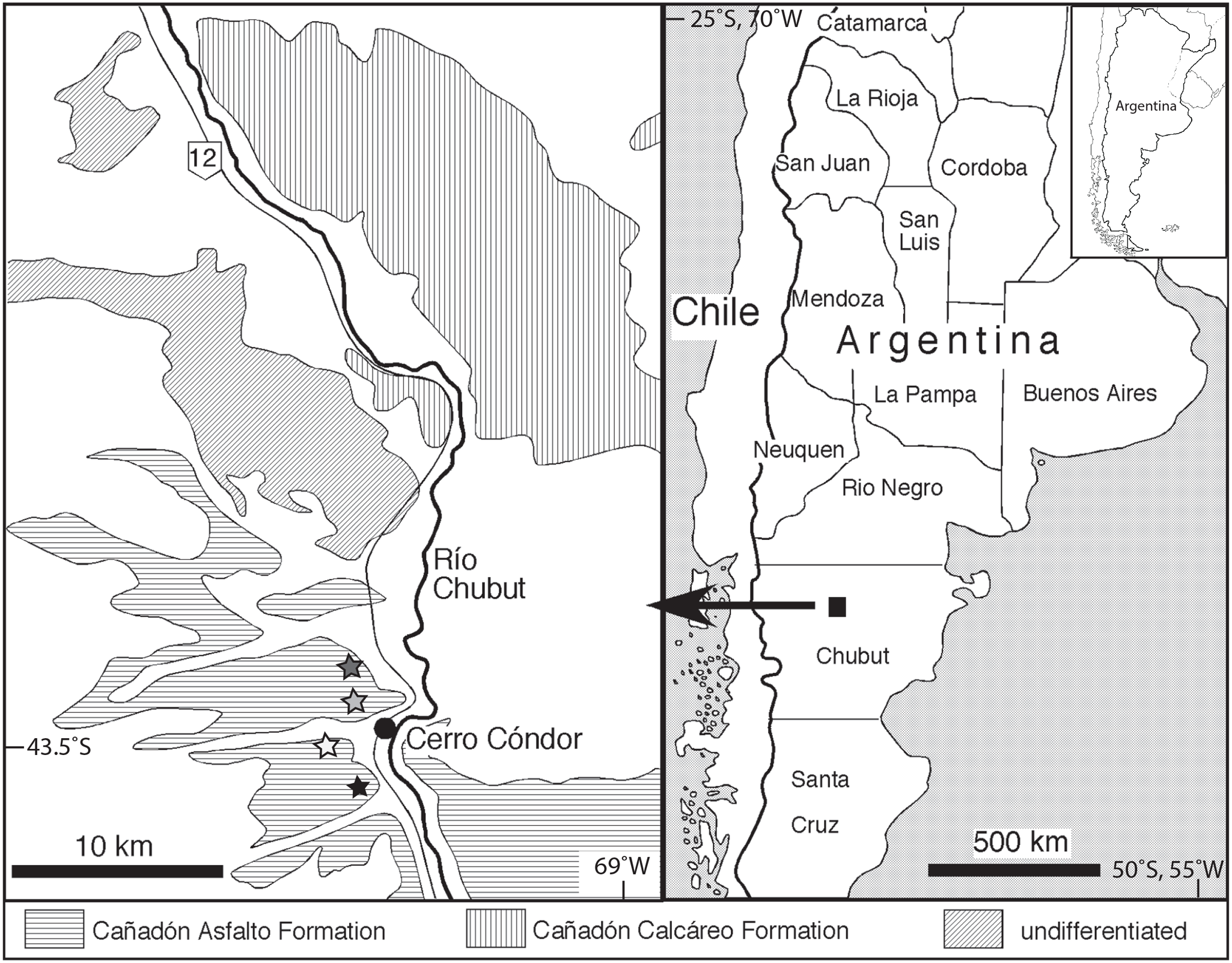
Formation map and location, Shaded vertically

The Cañadón Calcáreo Formation is composed mainly of fluvial deposits, which are found close to the Cañadón Asfalto Formation. While originally thought to be part of the Cañadón Asfalto, there is a lack of calcareous rocks, and the geologic faulting and folding are weaker. The Cañadón Calcáreo Formation is overlain by the Chubut Group, the rocks of which lack synsedimentary deformation. The area of the Cañadón Calcáreo also includes lacustrine and palustrine rocks, including shales, pelites, psammites and coarse clastics.

=== Age ===
The age of the Cañadón Calcáreo Formation was originally presumed to be Late Jurassic, probably Kimmeridgian to Tithonian in age. However, it has also been suggested to span the entire Late Jurassic, beginning in the Oxfordian, although this could also be because of the uncertainty of the youngest age Cañadón Asfalto Formation. A 2009 study of the palynology from a section of the formation revealed an age that was Hauterivian, which suggests that the formation extends from the Late Jurassic into the Early Cretaceous.

== Fossil content ==
=== Dinosaurs ===
==== Ornithischians ====
Ornithischians of the Cañadón Calcáreo Formation
Genus	Species	Location	Stratigraphic position	Material	Notes	Images
Stegosauria indet.	Indeterminate			Humerus	An indeterminate stegosaur	

==== Sauropods ====
Sauropods of the Cañadón Calcáreo Formation
Genus	Species	Location	Stratigraphic position	Material	Notes	Images
Bicharracosaurus	B. dionidei	Dionide 3		Partial skeletons consist of Cervical vertebrae	A macronarian sauropod	
Brachytrachelopan	B. mesai			Partial articulated skeleton including a nearly complete presacral column	A short-necked dicraeosaurid	
Diplodocidae Indet.	Indeterminate			Three dorsal vertebral centra and fragmentary scapula	A diplodocid sauropod	
Tehuelchesaurus	T. benitezii			Partial skeleton including skin impressions	A camarasaurid sauropod	
Titanosauriformes indet.	Indeterminate			Humerus, chevron	A titanosauriform sauropod; originally reported as a brachiosaurid	

==== Theropods ====
Theropods of the Cañadón Calcáreo Formation
Genus	Species	Location	Stratigraphic position	Material	Notes	Images
Abelisauridae indet.	Indeterminate			Cervical vertebra, fragmentary skeleton	A abelisaurid theropod	
Pandoravenator	P. fernandezorum			Partial skeleton	A tetanuran theropod	

=== Other reptiles ===
Miscellaneous reptiles of the Cañadón Calcáreo Formation
Genus	Species	Location	Stratigraphic position	Material	Notes	Images
Almadasuchus	A. fragilis			Partial skull and postcranial skeleton	A hallopodid crocodylomorph	
Rhynchocephalia indet.	Indeterminate		Lower	Partial articulated postcranial skeleton	A possible neosphenodontian	

=== Fish ===
Fishes of the Cañadón Calcáreo Formation
Genus	Species	Location	Stratigraphic position	Material	Notes	Images
Condorlepis	C. groeberi				A coccolepidid fish	
Luisiella	L. feruglioi				A luisiellid fish	

=== Crustaceans ===
Crustaceans of the Cañadón Calcáreo Formation
Genus	Species	Location	Stratigraphic position	Material	Notes	Images
Congestheriella	C. rauhuti				A clam shrimp	
Mandelstamia	M. spp.				A limnocytherid ostracodan	
Metacypris	M. sp.				A loxoconchidae ostracodan	
Pseudestherites	P. sp.				A clam shrimp	
Theryosinoecum	T. barrancalensis minor				A cytheroid ostracodan	
Timiriasevia	T. sp.				A limnocytherid ostracodan	

=== Insects ===
Insects of the Cañadón Calcáreo Formation
Genus	Species	Location	Stratigraphic position	Material	Notes	Images
Chironomidae indet.	Indeterminate					
Neorthophlebidae indet.	Indeterminate					

=== Plants ===
Plants of the Cañadón Calcáreo Formation
Genus	Species	Location	Stratigraphic position	Material	Notes	Images
Pararaucaria	P. delfueyoi				A pine	

== See also ==
- List of dinosaur-bearing rock formations
- Lotena Formation, contemporaneous formation of the Neuquén Basin
- Los Molles Formation, contemporaneous formation of the Neuquén Basin
