= Engaño Bay =

Waterbody in Argentina

Coordinates: 43°22′S 65°03′W

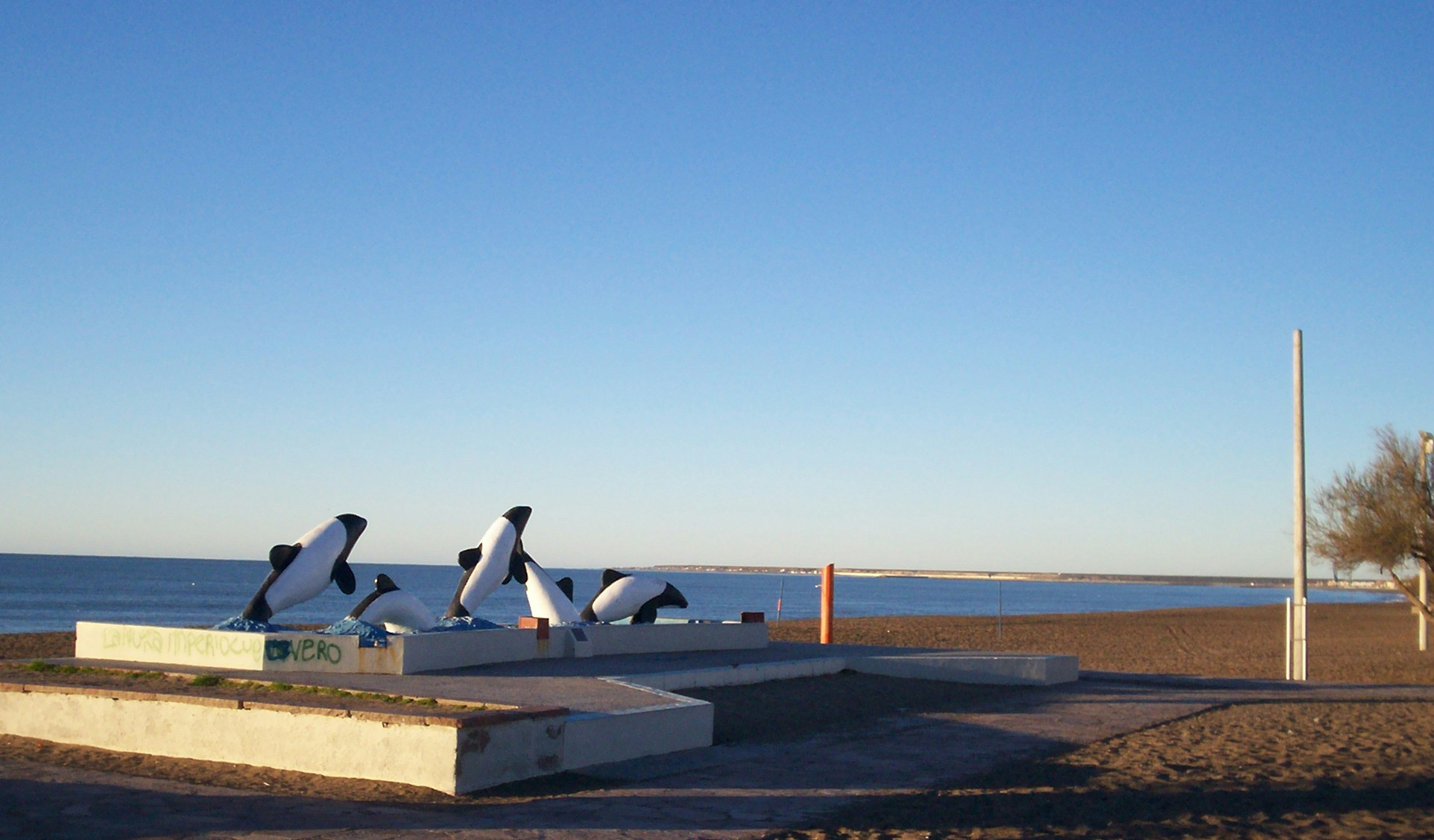
Playa Union Toninas

Engaño Bay is a bay off the coast of Rawson, Patagonia, Argentina.

The Chubut River drains into the Atlantic Ocean at Engaño Bay . The bay is rather shallow but is known for its high productivity of shrimps and small fish throughout the warmer months.
