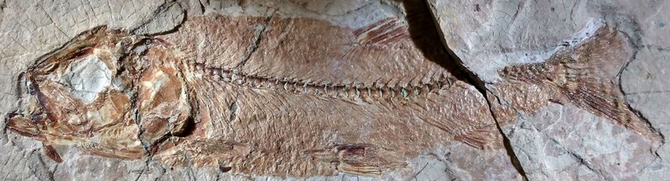

Scientific classification
- Kingdom: Animalia
- Phylum: Chordata
- Class: Actinopterygii
- Family: †Luisiellidae
- Genus: †Luisiella; Bocchino, 1967
- Species: †L. feruglioi

Binomial name
- †Luisiella feruglioi (Bordas, 1942) [originally Tharrhias]

= Luisiella =

Luisiella Temporal range: Kimmeridgian

Extinct genus of ray-finned fishes

Luisiella is an extinct genus of prehistoric bony fish that lived during the Kimmeridgian stage of the Late Jurassic epoch. Fossils of the genus have been found in either the Cañadón Calcáreo Formation or Cañadón Asfalto Formation in Chubut Province, Argentina.

== See also ==
- List of prehistoric bony fish genera
