= Paso del Sapo Formation =

Maastrichtian geologic formation of the Cañadón Asfalto Basin in Argentina

- Stratigraphic range: Maastrichtian; ~70–66 Ma
- Type: Geological formation
- Underlies: La Colonia & Lefipán Formations
- Overlies: Cerro Barcino Formation

Lithology
- Primary: Siltstone

Location
- Coordinates: 42.7°S 70.0°W
- Approximate paleocoordinates: 44.9°S 58.5°W
- Region: Chubut Province
- Country: Argentina
- Extent: Cañadón Asfalto Basin

Type section
- Named for: Paso del Sapo
- Paso del Sapo Formation (Argentina)

The Paso del Sapo Formation is a Maastrichtian geologic formation of the Cañadón Asfalto Basin in Argentina. The siltstones of the formation were deposited in a lacustrine environment. Plesiosaur remains are among the fossils that have been recovered from its strata.

== Fossil content ==
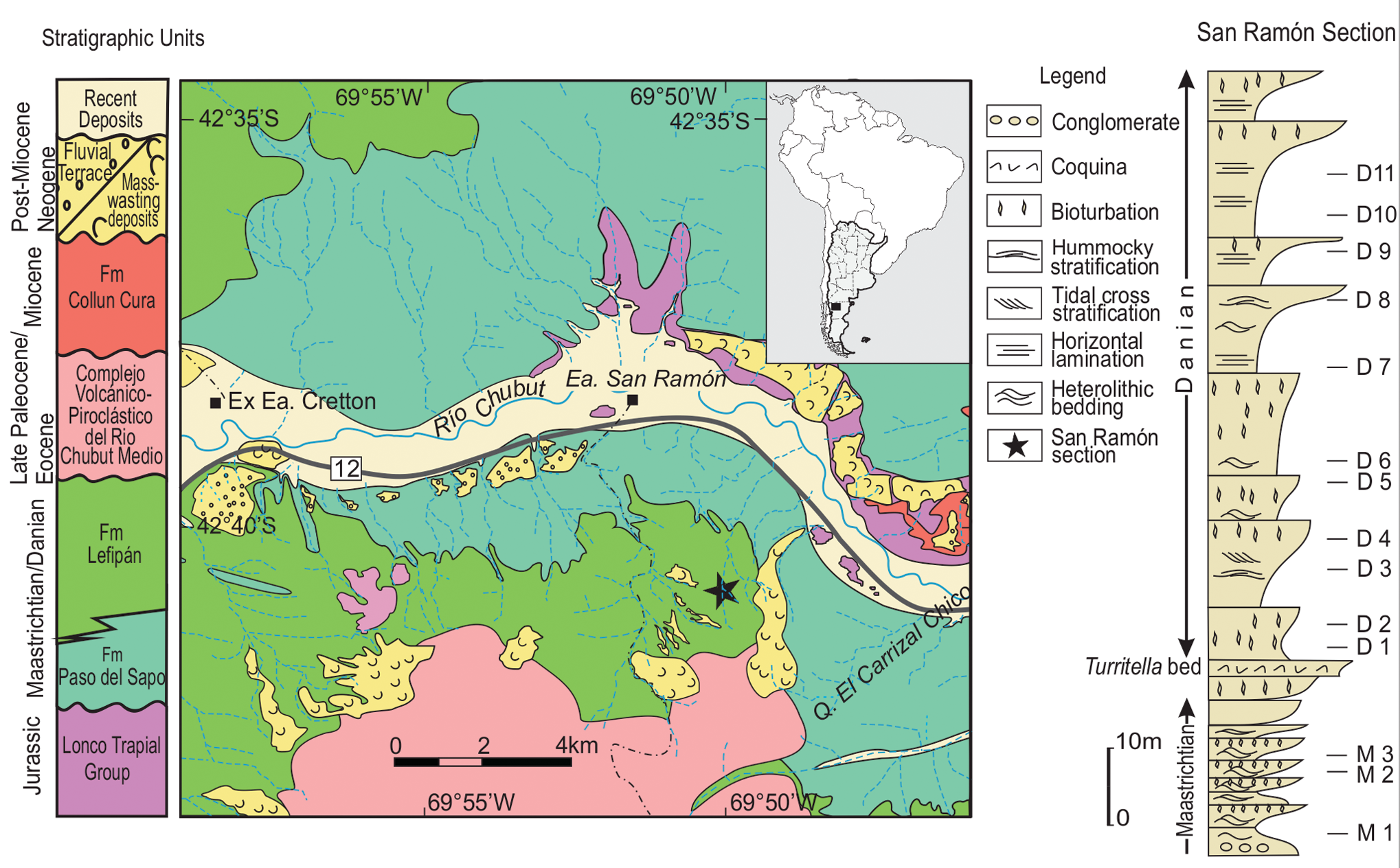
Geologic map of outcrops of the formation

- Aristonectes parvidens
- Ptychoceratodus sp.
- Flora

== See also ==
- Plesiosaur stratigraphic distribution
