= Cocatherium =

Cocatherium Temporal range: Early Danian (pre-Tiupampan) ~64 Ma

Scientific classification
- Domain: Eukaryota
- Kingdom: Animalia
- Phylum: Chordata
- Class: Mammalia
- Infraclass: Marsupialia
- Order: †?Polydolopimorphia
- Genus: †Cocatherium; Goin et al. 2006
- Species: †C. lefipanum

Binomial name
- †Cocatherium lefipanum Goin et al. 2006

Extinct genus of marsupials

Cocatherium is an extinct genus of marsupial mammals of uncertain family placement, from the earliest Paleocene (early Danian) of South America, predating the Tiupampan South American land mammal age. The genus was described based on a fossil molar that was found in the Danian part of the Cretaceous-Paleogene Lefipán Formation in the Cañadón Asfalto Basin in north-central Patagonia, Argentina. The type species of the genus is C. lefipanum.

The mammal, probably belonging to the Polydolopimorphia, is the oldest known representative of marsupials or any therian mammal in the Southern Hemisphere.

== Etymology ==
The genus was named Cocatherium ("Coca Beast") after "Coca", the nickname of San Martín of Estancia San Ramón, who assisted the researchers of the Museo de La Plata in working in the region where the fossils were found. The species epithet lefipanum honors Lefipán, one of the most prominent native Mapuche inhabitants of the region where the Lefipán Formation was deposited.

== Description ==
Cocatherium was described on the basis of the holotype fossil LIEB-PV 1001, an isolated right lower molar with a total length 2.90 millimetres (0.114 in), a trigonid width of 2.20 millimetres (0.087 in) and a talonid width of 2.27 millimetres (0.089 in). The molar has a well-developed wear pattern, contains all the features characteristic of a therian mammal and indicates it belonged to a bunodont marsupial of relatively large size. The mammal is the oldest known representative of marsupials or any therian mammal in the Southern Hemisphere. The presence of the mammal predates the Tiupampan South American land mammal age.

== Classification ==
Cocatherium probably represents a basal polydolopiform, closely related to Roberthoffstetteria. Polydolopoids are dentally derived marsupials primarily from the Paleocene and Eocene of South America. At least two genera are known from Antarctica. According to the describing authors, the genus possibly belongs to the ?Polydolopimorphia, together with other North and South American genera as Iugomortiferum from the Campanian Wahweap Formation of Utah, Bonapartherium from the Casamayoran Lumbrera Formation and Mustersan Geste Formation of Argentina, Epidolops of the Itaboraian Las Flores Formation of the Golfo San Jorge Basin, Polydolops from Eocene Argentina, La Meseta Formation of Antarctica and Deseadan Salla Formation of Bolivia, Prepidolops, from the Lumbrera Formation, Ectocentrocristus, from the Maastrichtian Judith River and Kirtland Formations of the United States, Roberthoffstetteria of the Tiupampan Santa Lucía Formation of Bolivia, Procaroloameghinia of Las Flores Formation, and Caroloameghinia from the Casamayoran Sarmiento Formation of Argentina.

== Paleoecology ==
The Lefipán Formation ranges in age from the late Maastrichtian to the early Danian and preserves the Cretaceous-Paleogene boundary, though the exact layer is disturbed by bioturbation. The Danian section of the formation shows a remarkably rapid recovery from the extinction event, with aquatic plant taxa virtually undisturbed and other flora reappearing quickly. A layer in the formation, known as the Turitella bed, is considered closest to the onset of the Paleogene and the fossil of Cocatherium, as well as the bivalve Meretrix chalcedonica, was found approximately 5 metres (16 ft) above the estimated K/Pg boundary.

The formation has provided several macro- and microfossils of flora, which has led researchers to conclude the rapid recovery and low extinction rate of several genera and families of plants. Hemipteran insect predation on leaves is noted at levels slightly above the K/Pg boundary. While Cocatherium is the only mammal found in the formation, shark, and ray teeth of Hypolophodon patagoniensis, occur in the Danian section and are indicative of a shallow marine to littoral (coastal) environment.

== See also ==
- Chulpasia, from Early Eocene (Itaboraian) Peru
- Didelphodon, from Campanian to Maastrichtian North America
- Eodelphis, from Campanian North America
