= Congestheriella =

Congestheriella Temporal range: Upper Jurassic

Scientific classification
- Kingdom: Animalia
- Phylum: Arthropoda
- Subphylum: Crustacea
- Class: Branchiopoda
- Order: (Conchostraca) Spinicaudata
- Superfamily: †Afrograptioidea
- Family: †Afrograptidae
- Genus: †Congestheriella Kobayashi, 1954

Species
- Congestheriella elegans Bonev 1968; Congestheriella elliptoidea (Bock); Congestheriella olsoni; Congestheriella rauhuti Gallego and Shen; Congestheriella tuberculata

Genus of small freshwater animals

Congestheriella is an extinct genus of fossil branchiopods in the order Spinicaudata.
