= Chubut River =

River in southern Argentina

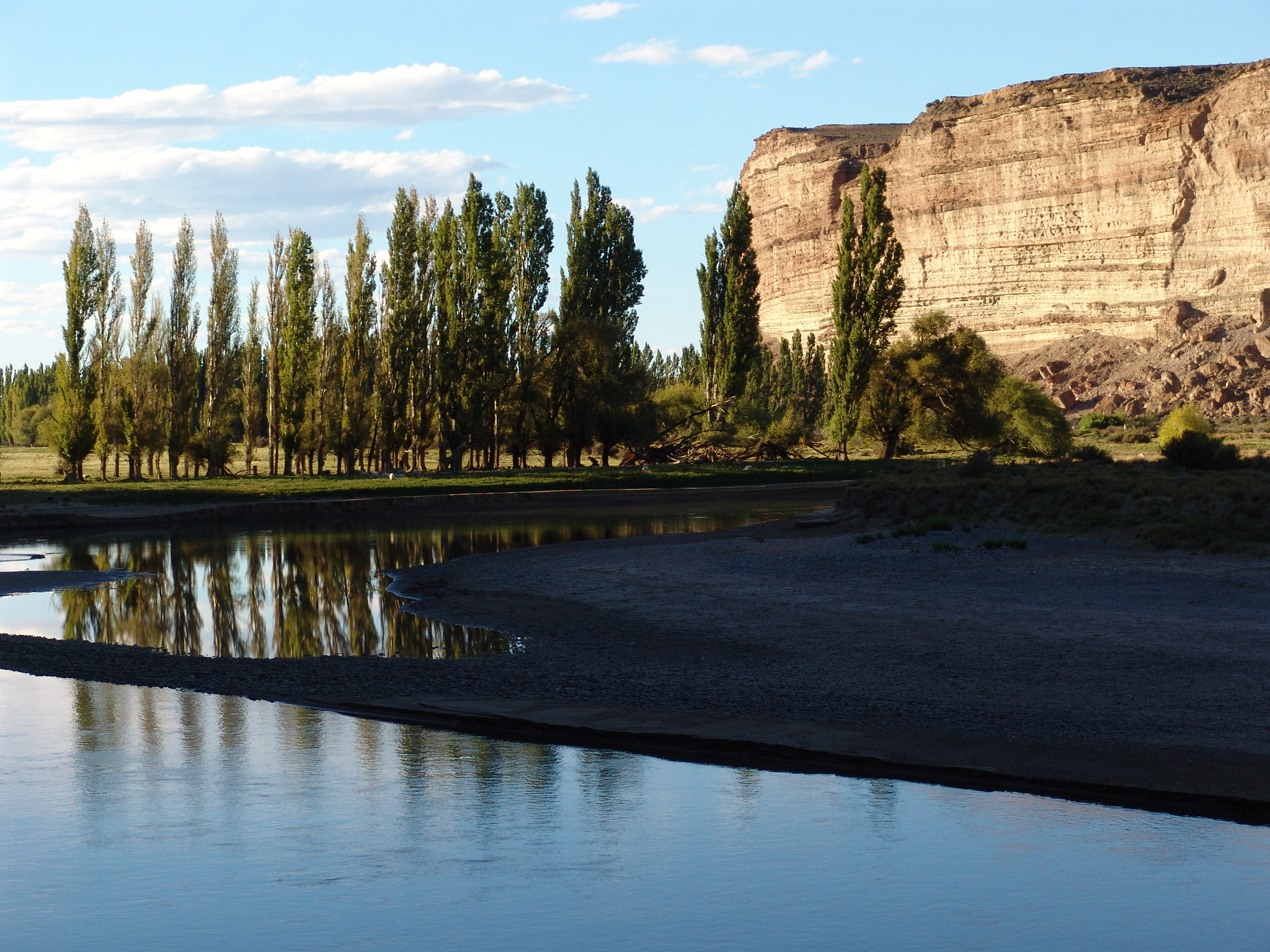
- A valley at Chubut River

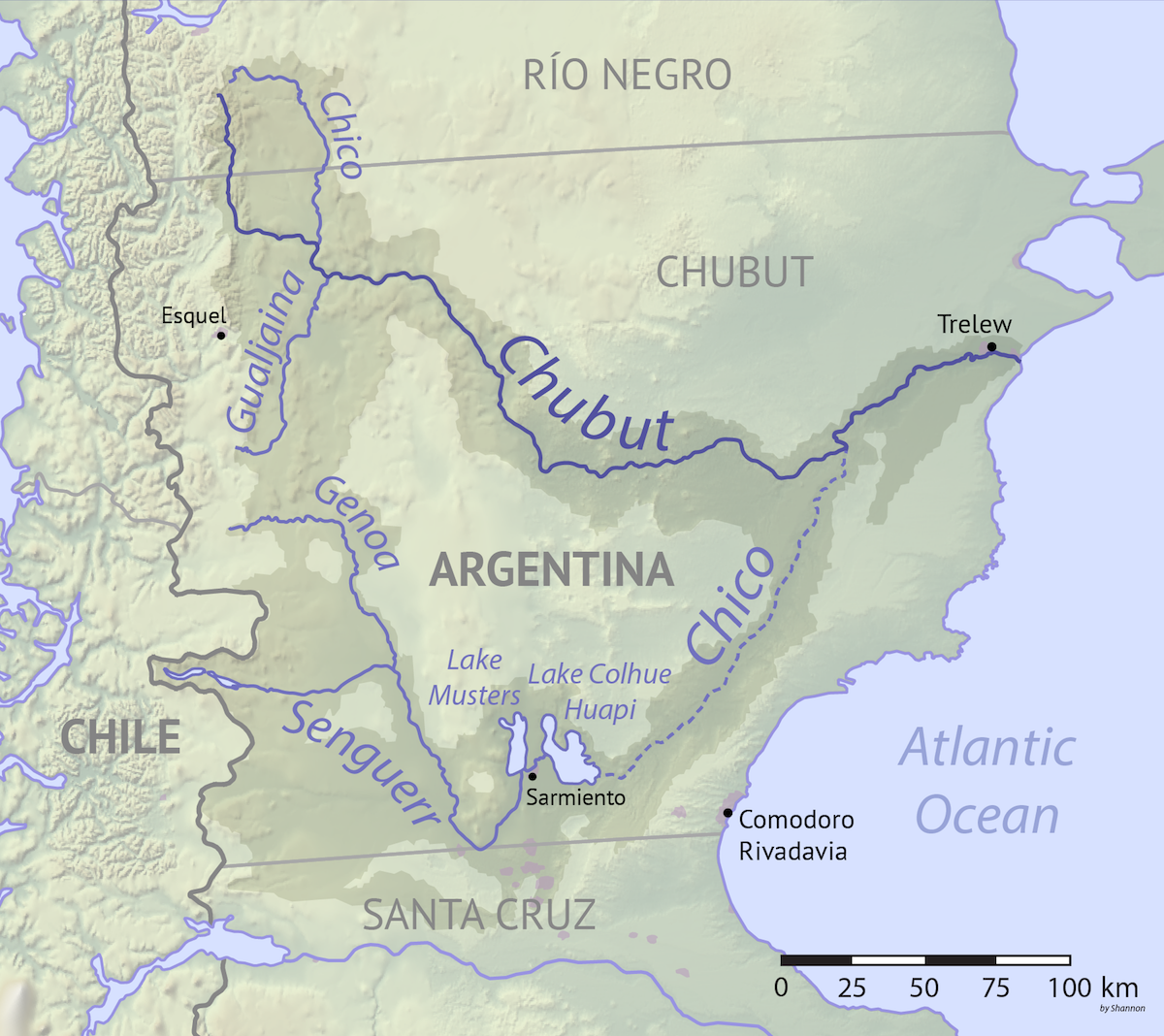
- Map of the Chubut drainage basin

- Location of mouth

Location
- Country: Argentina
- Province: Chubut Province

Physical characteristics
- Mouth
  - coordinates: 43°20′32″S 65°03′18″W

The Chubut River (English: /tʃʊˈbʊt/; Spanish: Río Chubut; Welsh: Afon Camwy [ˈavɔn ˈkamʊɨ̯]) is located in the Patagonia region of southern Argentina. Its name comes from the Tehuelche word chupat, which means 'transparent'. The Argentine Chubut Province, through which the river flows, is named after it. Welsh settlers called the river Afon Camwy, meaning 'twisting river'.

The river is generally shallow and its water flow can vary from 4 to 400 cubic metres per second (140 to 14,130 cu ft/s) between drought and flood. Average discharge is about 60 cubic metres per second (2,100 cu ft/s).

Flooding made the lands beside the river fertile and important for agriculture. The river has great importance for the agricultural and general economy of the province. There were several attempts to create dams near the two townships of Rawson and Gaiman. The Chubut River has a very rare characteristic being higher than the land around it which is mostly arid. Wheat farming was the chief crop and mainstay of the agricultural and commercial resources of Patagonia. At this time the settlers were struggling with finance as they were using sterling, which was in very short supply.

Wheat and barley became a more readily available material to trade with. The control of water for irrigation became even more important to newly arriving settlers who were allocated parcels of land or "chacras" issued by the Argentine government in the lower part of the valley. In 1882, following a very bad harvest in 1881, a scheme of irrigation ditches from a new canal would ensure consistent watering of crops and deal with the vagaries of the flow of the Chubut. This was key to the survival of the whole Chubut valley.

The construction of the canal and irrigation system was overseen by a young Welshman, E. J. Williams. His meticulous planning created a detailed system of ditches and channels according to an agreed size and fee structure with the settlers. These landowners dug the channels themselves with simple tools.

The river is also a popular trout fishing destination.

== Course ==
The river flows eastwards for approximately 800 kilometres (500 mi), from the Andes to the Atlantic Ocean, emptying at Engaño Bay near Rawson. The main arm of the Chubut originates in Carreras, Río Negro Province, and its basin covers a large area of the western Andean foothills between Bariloche and Esquel. It is also fed by the Chico River. The many branches join some distance before the small town of Piedra Parada, where the terrain becomes the flat plain characteristic of Argentinian Patagonia. It flows east and passes by the town of Paso del Sapo, where it turns southeast through relatively unpopulated central Chubut. It meets Highway 25 and turns east once again.

== Hydroelectric power ==
A 255-metre (837 ft) long concrete dam blocks the river some 120 kilometres (75 mi) west of Trelew. This dam, named after paleontologist Florentino Ameghino, was designed in 1943 by engineer Antonio Domingo Pronsato; work started on 19 April 1963. The artificial lake covers 70 square kilometres (27 mi^{2}). The plant, which uses a 56-metre (184 ft) high waterfall with a flow of 150 cubic metres per second (5,300 cu ft/s) and three turbines, provides energy to Pico Truncado, Caleta Olivia, Comodoro Rivadavia, and the lower Chubut Valley.

== History ==
In the 19th century, Welsh settlers arrived in Chubut and established the colony Y Wladfa (Spanish:Colonia Gales) in the valley of the Chubut river. Today, the Welsh language and Welsh tea houses are common in several towns, many of which have Welsh names. Dolavon and Trelew are examples of Welsh towns.

There are historical records of floods in the valley each year in the 1865–1884 period except 1866 and 1873, and then in 1899, 1901, 1902, 1904, 1923, 1932, 1939, 1944, 1945, 1946, 1949, 1950, 1951 and 1958. Flooding in the 1884–1901 period devastated most of all the town of Gaiman but also Rawson. As consequence Trelew that lied in a more protected position grew in importance.

Flooding was averted in 1893 by the construction of flood defenses. The Florentino Ameghino Dam has since its inauguration in 1963 regulated the flow of the river in the lower Chubut valley. The floods of 1899 and 1901 had a particularly strong impact on the nascent urban settlements. After the dam construction there were floods, many of them caused directly by local rains, in 1964, 1968, 1976, 1992, 1993, 1998, 1999, 2002, 2004, 2006, 2008, 2010 and 2017.
