= Paso del Sapo =

- Municipality and village
- Location within Chubut Province
- Coordinates: 42°44′0″S 069°36′0″W
- Country: Argentina
- Province: Chubut Province
- Department: Languiñeo Department
- Created: 15 June 1955
- Time zone: UTC−3 (ART)
- Postal code: 9201
- Area code: 02945 479-XXX
- Climate: BSk

Paso del Sapo is a village and municipality in Chubut Province in southern Argentina. Its boundaries were established in 1995. The Paso del Sapo Formation is named after the village.

== Gallery ==
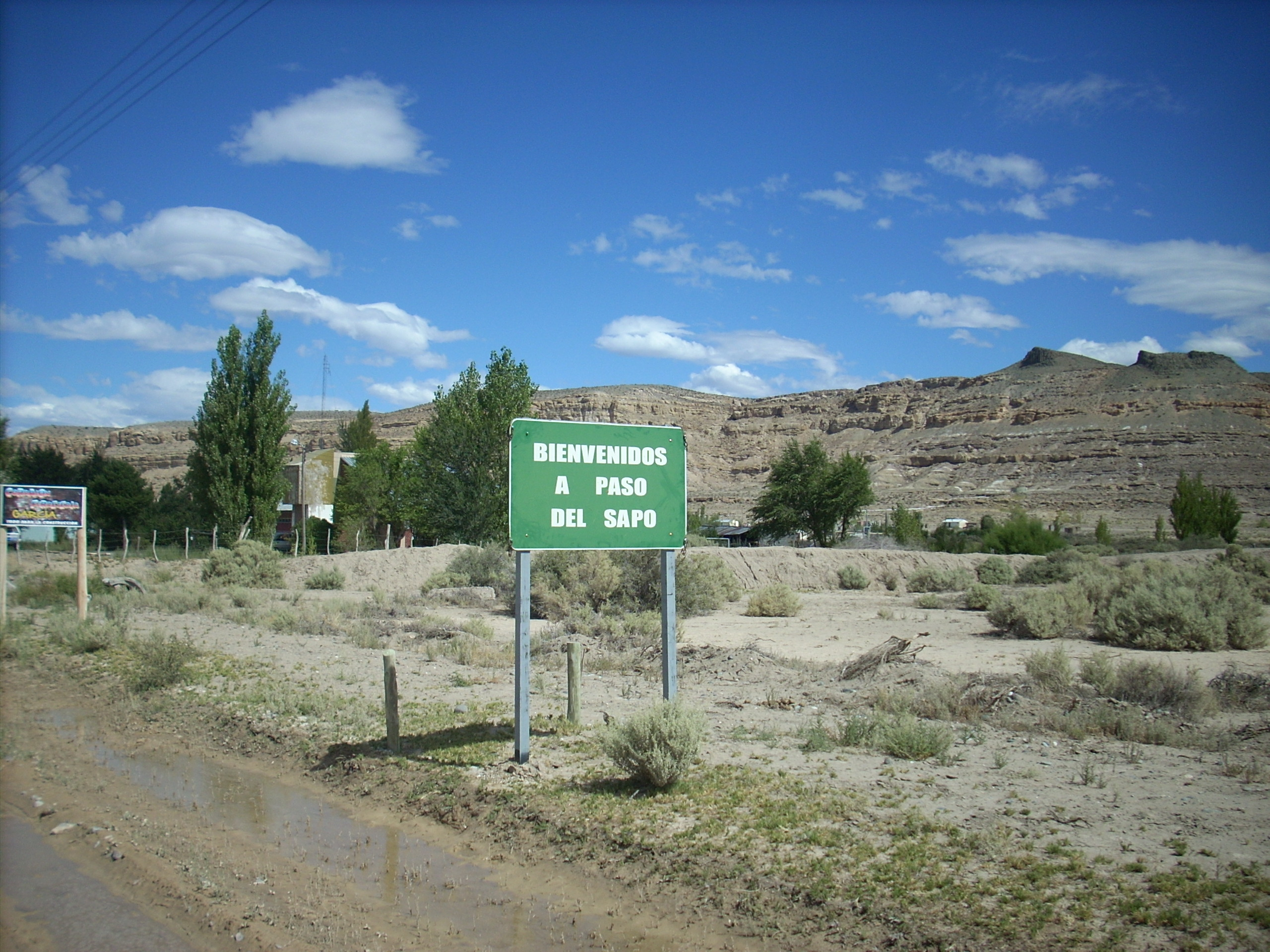
Sign on entering Paso del Sapo

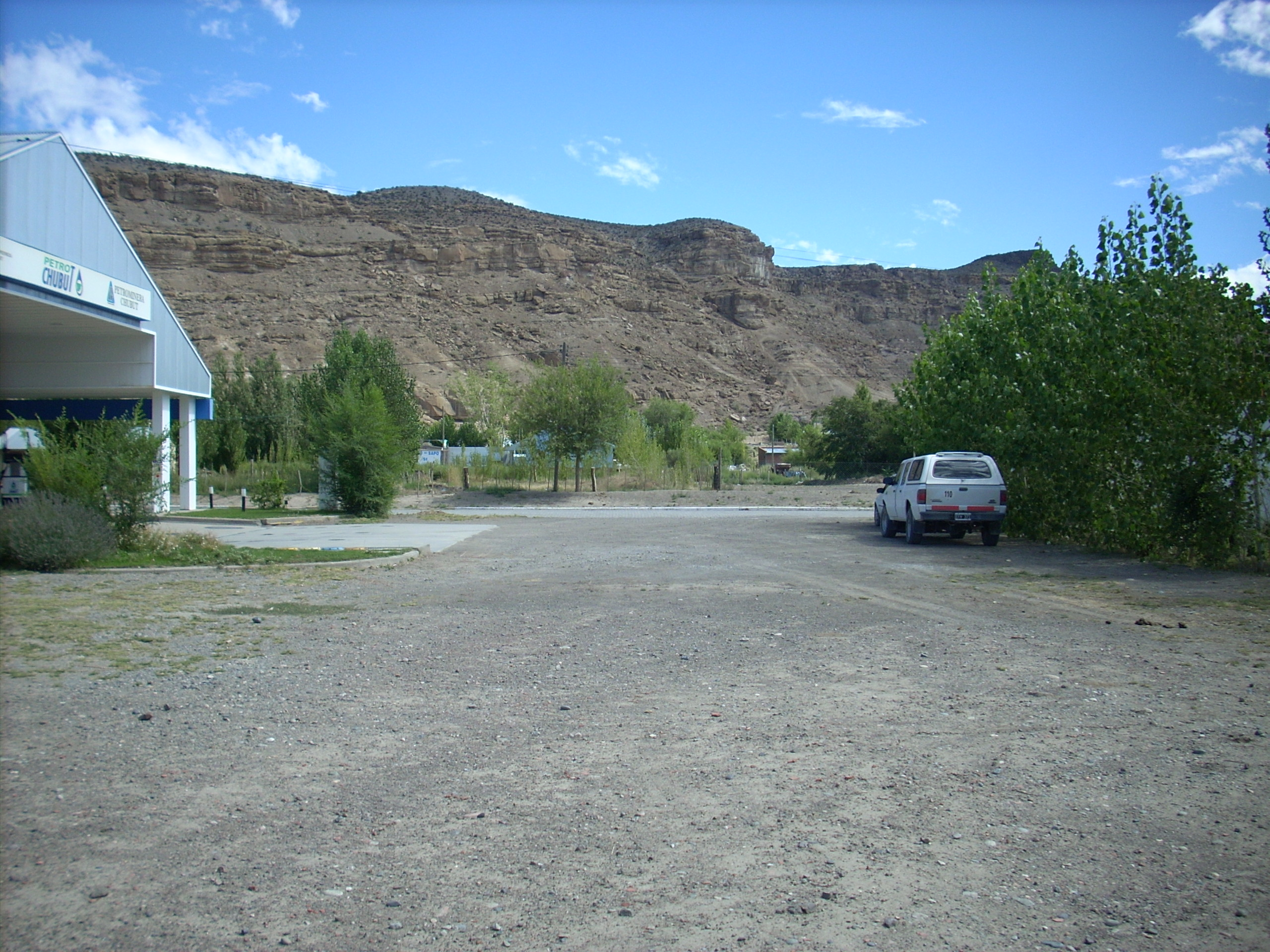
View of Paso del Sapo

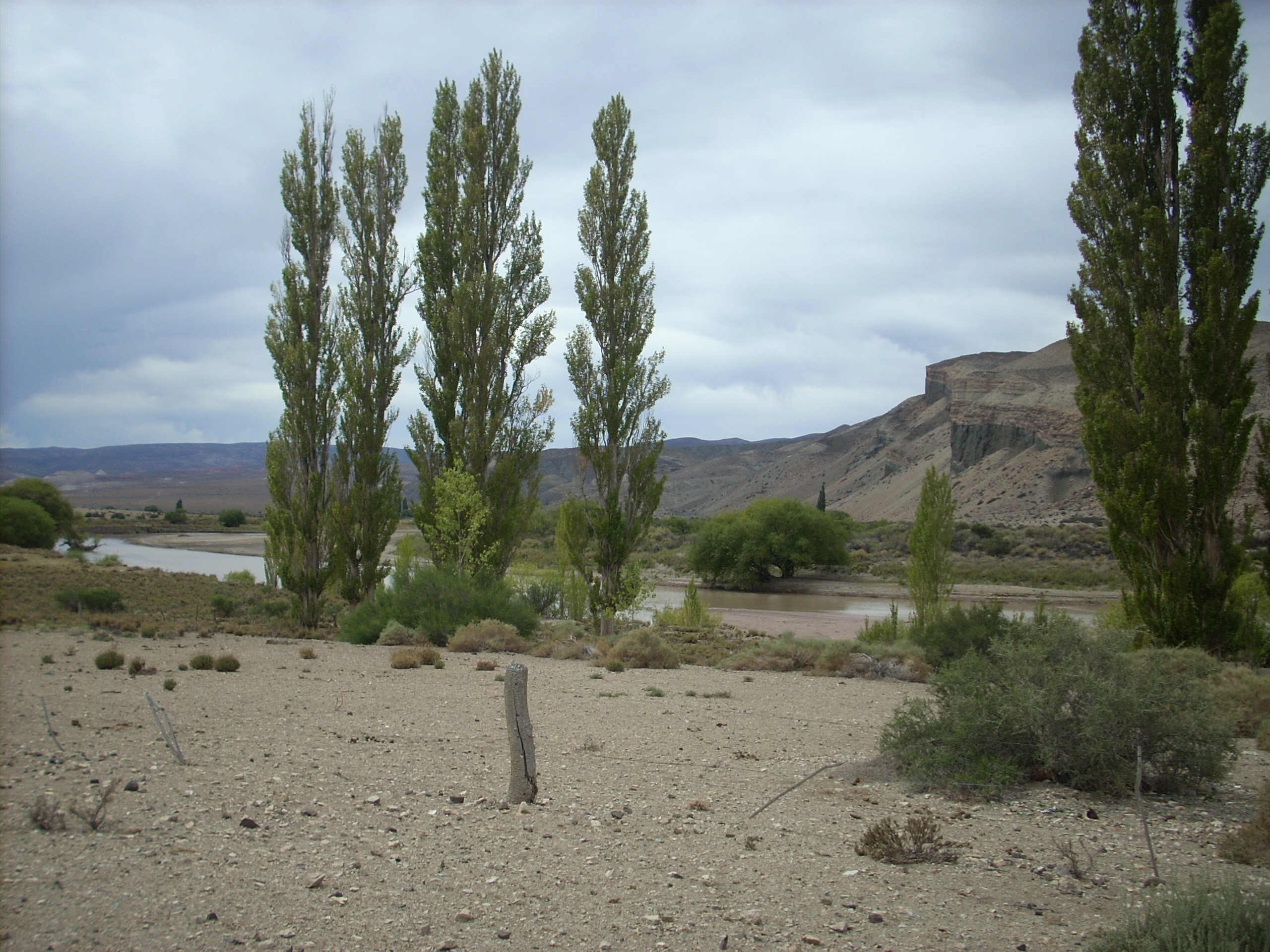
The Chubut River above Paso del Sapo
