= Cerro Barcino Formation =

Geological formation in South America

- Stratigraphic range: Aptian-Cenomanian; ~118–98 Ma
- Type: Geological formation
- Unit of: Chubut Group
- Sub-units: Las Plumas; Cerro Castaño; Puesto La Paloma; Bayo Overo
- Underlies: Puesto Manuel Arce Formation
- Overlies: Los Adobes Formation

Lithology
- Primary: Mudstone, sandstone
- Other: Conglomerate, tuff

Location
- Coordinates: 43.8°S 68.6°W
- Approximate paleocoordinates: 44.7°S 35.1°W
- Region: Chubut Province
- Country: Argentina
- Extent: Cañadón Asfalto Basin

Type section
- Named for: Cerro Barcino
- Cerro Barcino Formation (Argentina)

The Cerro Barcino Formation (also known as the Gorro Frigio Formation) is a geological formation in South America whose strata span the Early Cretaceous to the earliest Late Cretaceous. The top age for the formation has been estimated to be Cenomanian. Earlier estimates placed the formation until the Campanian.

The formation was deposited in the Cañadón Asfalto Basin, a rift basin that started forming in the earliest Jurassic. Dinosaur remains are among the fossils that have been recovered from the formation.

The Cerro Barcino Formation is the second-youngest unit of the Chubut Group, which also includes the older Los Adobes Formation. Both formations cover a vast area in Chubut Province, Argentina. The two formations are distinguished by geological features suggesting a distinct change in climate, from a wetter, flood plain environment in the Los Adobes to a much more arid, desert-like environment in the Cerro Barcino.

The Cerro Barcino Formation is subdivided into several subunits (members). From oldest to youngest:

- Bayo Overo (Correlates with both the Puesto La Paloma and the Cerro Castaño members)
- Puesto La Paloma
  - Characterized by arid plains interspersed with sand dunes
- Cerro Castaño
  - A return to more humid, flood-plain conditions
- Las Plumas

The Puesto La Paloma Member dates from ~118-113 Ma, the Cerro Castaño Member dates from ~113-100.5 Ma, correlating with the Albian, and the Las Plumas Member dates from ~100.5-98 Ma.

== Fossil content ==
Possible rebbachisaurid remains are known from the La Paloma Member.

=== Lepidosaurs ===
Lepidosaurs of the Cerro Barcino Formation
Genus	Species	Location	Stratigraphic position	Material	Notes	Images
Kaikaifilusaurus	K. minimus					

=== Testudinatans ===
Testudinatans of the Cerro Barcino Formation
Genus	Species	Location	Stratigraphic position	Material	Notes	Images
Chubutemys	C. copelloi					
Prochelidella	P. cerrobarcinae					

=== Crurotarsans ===
Crocodylomorphs of the Cerro Barcino Formation
Genus	Species	Location	Stratigraphic position	Material	Notes	Images
Barcinosuchus	B. gradilis	Near El Escorial village, Chubut Province	Cerro Castaño Member	Skull, mandible, and postcranial remains	A peirosaurid. The first crocodyliform from the Chubut Group	

=== Dinosaurs ===
==== Sauropods ====
Sauropods of the Cerro Barcino Formation
Genus	Species	Member	Material	Notes	Images
Chubutisaurus	C. insignis	Bayo Overo	Two partial skeletons	A basal somphospondylan	
Patagotitan	P. mayorum	Cerro Castaño	Partial skeleton and other elements	A huge lognkosaur	

==== Theropods ====
Theropods of the Cerro Barcino Formation
Genus	Species	Member	Material	Notes	Images
Abelisauroidea	Indeterminate	La Paloma member	Vertebrae	Very similar to the later and more large-bodied abelisauroids from South America such as Carnotaurus	
Genyodectes	G. serus	Cerro Castaño	Partial snout	A possible ceratosaurid	
"Megalosaurus"	"M." inexpectatus	Bayo Overo	Teeth	An indeterminate abelisaurid originally described as a species of Megalosaurus	
Tyrannotitan	T. chubutensis	Cerro Castaño	Two partial skeletons and teeth	A giant giganotosaurin carcharodontosaurid	

== See also ==
- List of dinosaur-bearing rock formations
- La Amarga Formation, contemporaneous fossiliferous formation of the Neuquén Basin
- Lohan Cura Formation, contemporaneous fossiliferous formation of the Neuquén Basin
- Río Belgrano Formation, contemporaneous fossiliferous formation of the Austral Basin
