= North Patagonian Massif =

North Patagonian Massif Somún Cura Massif
- Massif
- Interactive map of North Patagonian Massif
- Coordinates: 41°13′45″S 68°19′35″W
- Location: Patagonia, Río Negro, Argentina
- Geology: Geology

Area
  - Total: 100,000 km^{2} (39,000 sq mi)

The North Patagonian Massif or Somún Cura Massif (Spanish: Macizo Norpatagónico, Macizo Nordpatagónico or Macizo de Somún Cura) is a massif in northern Patagonia located in the Argentine provinces of Río Negro and Chubut. The massif is a plateau surrounded by sedimentary basins. The North Patagonian Massif covers an area of approximately 100,000 square kilometres (39,000 sq mi). The massif rises 500 to 700 metres (1,600 to 2,300 ft) above the surrounding topography reaching a maximum of 1,200 metres (3,900 ft) above sea level. Compared to neighboring areas, the North Patagonian Massif has thicker continental crust.

== Stratigraphy ==
The massif consists of a basement formed by Cambro-Ordovician rocks, overlain by the Middle Silurian Sierra Grande Formation. The early Paleozoic section is covered by metamorphic and igneous complexes; the Permian Pailemán and Navarrete Plutonic Complexes, and the unconformably overlying Early to Middle Jurassic Marifil Volcanic Complex. The Marifil Complex is separated from the Paleozoic sequence by the Enjambre Dikes, dated to the Late Triassic with ages varying between 221 ± 12 and 207 ± 11 Ma.

The Cenozoic cover of the western belt of the massif comprises the Eocene to Oligocene Ventana and Ñirihuau Formations in the north and the Middle to Late Miocene Ñorquincó Formation in the south. The eastern belt of the North Patagonian Massif contains the Miocene (Colloncuran) Collón Cura Formation, the Miocene La Pava Formation, and the Miocene Chimehuín Formation in the northern part of the eastern belt.

== See also ==
- Golfo San Jorge Basin
- Neuquén Basin
