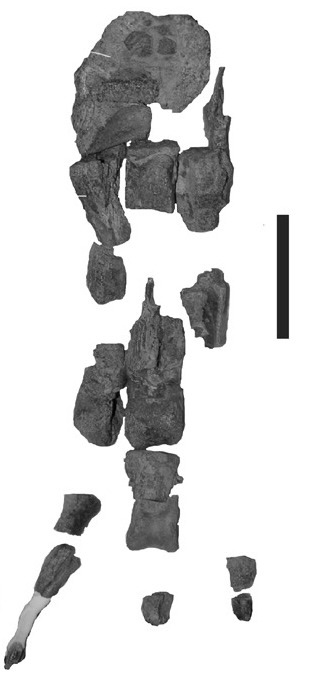
- Holotype of I. antarcticus

Scientific classification
- Kingdom: Animalia
- Phylum: Chordata
- Class: Reptilia
- Clade: Dinosauria
- Clade: Saurischia
- Clade: Theropoda
- Subfamily: †Unenlagiinae (?)
- Genus: †Imperobator; Ely & Case, 2019
- Species: †I. antarcticus

Binomial name
- †Imperobator antarcticus Ely & Case, 2019

= Imperobator =

Imperobator Temporal range: Late Cretaceous (Maastrichtian) 71–70 Ma

Extinct genus of dinosaurs

Imperobator ("powerful warrior") is a genus of probable unenlagiid paravian theropod dinosaurs, that lived during the Maastrichtian age of the Late Cretaceous in what is now James Ross Island in Antarctica. Imperobator is one of only two non-avian theropods known from Antarctica, crossing over to the landmass when it was part of Gondwana. The only described specimen was found in 2003 by an expedition launched by the University of California Museum of Paleontology and initially described as a dromaeosaur in 2007. The fossil was formally described as a new genus in 2019, and later searches reported more fossils from the site including teeth and skull bones.

It was initially suggested that Imperobator may be one of the largest known paravians, comparable in size to gigantic dromaeosaurids such as Utahraptor and Austroraptor, but subsequent anatomical revisions suggested a body length similar to that of Neuquenraptor and Deinonychus. Because the preserved material appeared to lack the characteristic "sickle claw" of dromaeosaurs on the second digit, Imperobator was initially classified as a basal paravian of uncertain affinities, though later researchers found support for unenlagiine affinities.

It was discovered in the Cape Lamb Member strata of the Snow Hill Island Formation, which bears a variety of other fossils, many of them unique as they evolved in the isolation of Antarctica after the breakup of Gondwana. Imperobator coexisted with the ornithopod dinosaur Morrosaurus and bird Antarcticavis in addition to a menagerie of mosasaurs, plesiosaurs, and a pterosaur.

== Discovery and naming ==
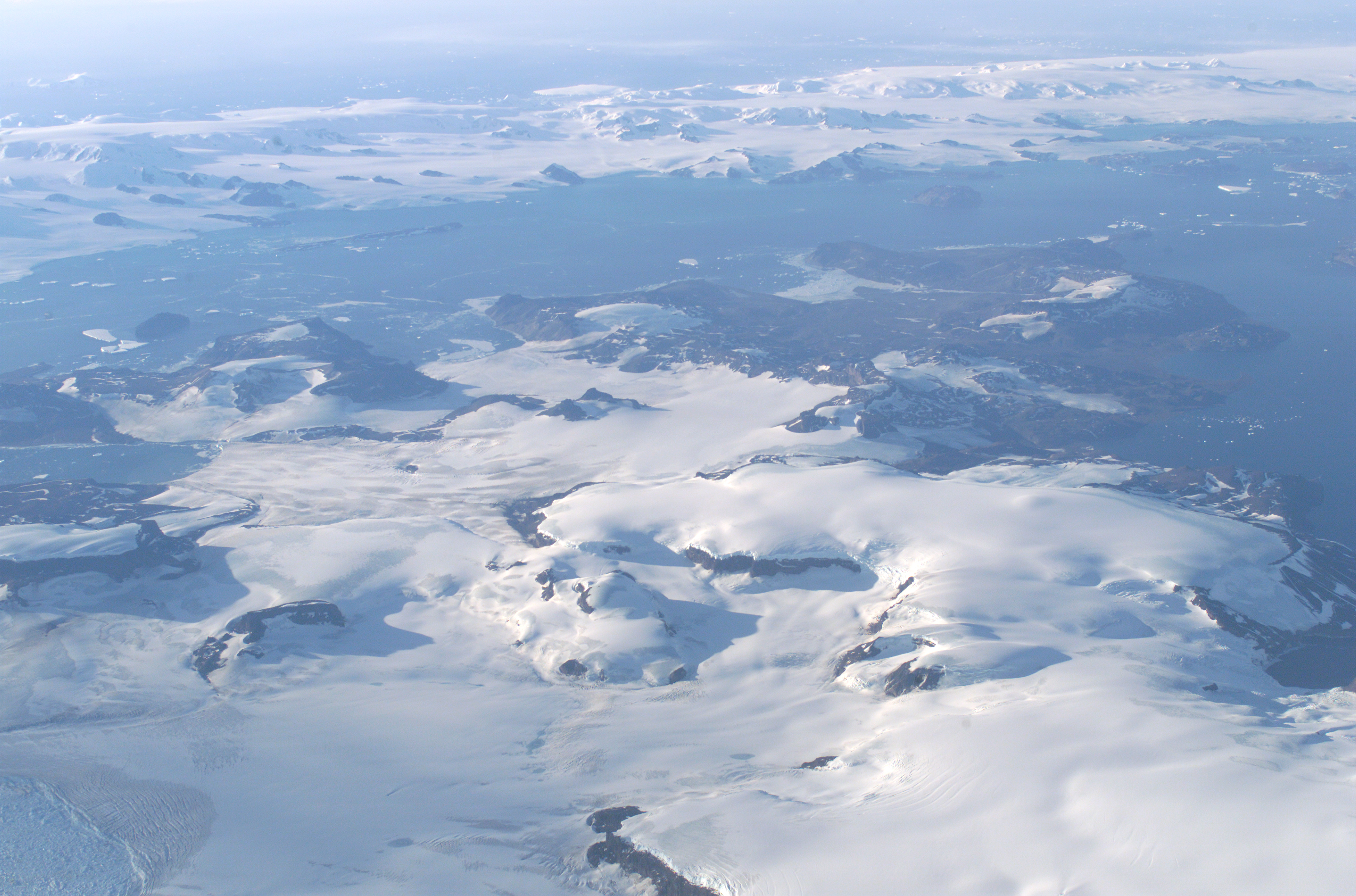
Aerial view photo of James Ross Island, where Imperobator was discovered.

Fossils of a large theropod dinosaur were unearthed in December 2003 by a fossil hunting expedition that had been mounted by the University of California Museum of Paleontology to the Naze Peninsula of James Ross Island, Antarctica to find fossils. The peninsula bears several fossiliferous outcrops of marine sediment. These belong to the Cape Lamb Member of the Snow Hill Island Formation, which dates to the early Maastrictian age of the Late Cretaceous (~71 mya). The fossils were unearthed in 2003, consisting mostly of an incomplete isolated left pes including a portion of the tibia, an incomplete astragalus, a partial calcaneus and fibula, ungual, partial phalanges and metacarpals, though teeth are known as well. They were then deposited at the University of California Museum of Paleontology under catalog number UCMP 276000. However, additional fossils were located in the facilities of Eastern Washington University and the South Dakota School of Mines and Technology that pertain to UCMP 276000 including skull fragments which may be from the premaxilla, maxilla, and/or dentary as well as a caudal vertebra, more teeth, and pedal elements. The third Antarctic Peninsula Paleontology Project expedition in 2011 and 2016 to the same locality found even more fossils from the UCMP 276000 individual, such as a tooth, incomplete pedal ungual, cranial fragments, and indeterminate bone shards, now in the collections of the American Museum of Natural History under number AMNH FARB 30894. According to Lamanna et al. (2019), an ongoing description of the novel remains is in the works.

The fossils were first reported in published literature in 2005, with the authors theorizing that the specimen was of a "primitive holdover of the original Gondwanan dinosaur assemblage", noting its less derived characteristics compared to other Maastrichtian dromaeosaurs. A more detailed paper on the theropod specimen was published in 2007, which believed that it was of a dromaeosaurid, dubbing it the "Naze dromaeosaur" after the site in which it was found. The idea of the fossils being from a dromaeosaur is contentious, as the pes lacks the distinct sickle claw in addition to other characteristics of dromaeosaurs. The specimen was formally described as the holotype of a new genus and species, Imperobator antarcticus, by American paleontologists Ricardo Ely and Judd Case in 2019. The generic name derives from the Latin for "powerful warrior". The specific name refers to the continent in which the specimen was discovered.

== Description ==
The holotype specimen measures approximately 45 centimetres (18 in) in length, and it was initially estimated that Imperobator would have measured 2 metres (6.6 ft) tall, comparable to the size of the largest dromaeosaurs such as Utahraptor and Austroraptor. However, the previous estimate was criticized for its lack of specification about the parameters for calculations, and reexaminations of the phalanx III-1 and distal metatarsal III of Imperobator suggested that they were much smaller than those of Austroraptor and more similar in size to those of Neuquenraptor and Deinonychus, which led to the revision of its body length estimate to around 2–3 metres (6.6–9.8 ft). Despite prior assignment to Dromaeosauridae, Imperobator has since been assigned to the clade Paraves due to certain characteristics that differ from those of dromaeosaurids, including the lack of a sickle claw, the smooth surface of the distal metatarsal II and the lack of an ungual on the second pedal digit. Undescribed cranial material preserves teeth from the maxilla and dentary, which were long, curved, and bladed like in other carnivorous paravians.

=== Leg ===
Imperobator is known only from fragmentary remains of the hindlimb, but it is still unique in several ways. The distal portion of the left tibia (shin bone) and some of the astragalus are preserved, though much of their characteristic features are missing due to erosion and frost. According to the initial description, both calcanea are preserved and are fused with the fibulae, a unique trait of the genus, with a fossa (shallow depression) on the internal surface of the calcanea for articulation with the astragalus. The calcanea have a circular, smooth surface divided by a groove running along its dorsal side. The left tarsal is longer anteroposteriorly than it is wide with a sub-triangular outline in anterior view. However, a 2025 study by Matías Motta and colleagues stated that the elements are too weathered to be sure that they represent the calcanea and tibiae. Instead, they could be incomplete condyle fragments from metatarsals.

The metatarsals are preserved but are fragmented and broken. Of the ones preserved, metatarsals II and IV are broken into three pieces and metatarsal III into two pieces. Metatarsal V may be preserved, but it is not definitively stated by Ely & Case (2019). Metatarsal II is unique from that of other paravians in that it is parallelogram-shaped in cross-section, contrary to the circular or ovate forms in other genera. It also may preserve another diagnostic trait, a medial slant at the end of the diaphysis (midsection of the long bone), though this could be a pathological trait. Metatarsal III is heavily damaged but shows a symmetrical distal articular end and a triangle-shaped proximal end in anterior view, as in other paravians. The fourth metatarsal has a long ridge running along its posterior edge with a wider proximal end proportionally compared to the other metatarsals. The second pedal digit is incomplete, but a proximal half of phalanx II and the ungual is known from it. The third is represented by a proximal phalanx fragment, which is poorly preserved. A complete proximal-most phalanx of the fourth digit was also found. The incomplete ungual has a prominent flexor heel, a trait shared by the Romanian paravian Balaur. Motta and colleagues (2025) stated that Imperobator bears the sub-arctometatarsal condition observed in unenlagiines like Austroraptor, Pamparaptor, and others. This led the authors to state that was a synapomorphy of the family. Additionally, they reidentified the metatarsal II as the right metatarsal IV based on the presence of an intercondylar (between condyle) groove present in the metatarsal IVs of deinonychosaurs like Deinonychus, Buitreraptor, and Talos. The authors continued to suggest that the left metatarsal IV described by Ely & Case (2019) could instead be a fragment of the phalanx IV-1 based on features of its proximal articular end. A fragment of the middle portion of a long bone, identified as from the metatarsal IV, may really come from a metatarsal III.

== Classification ==
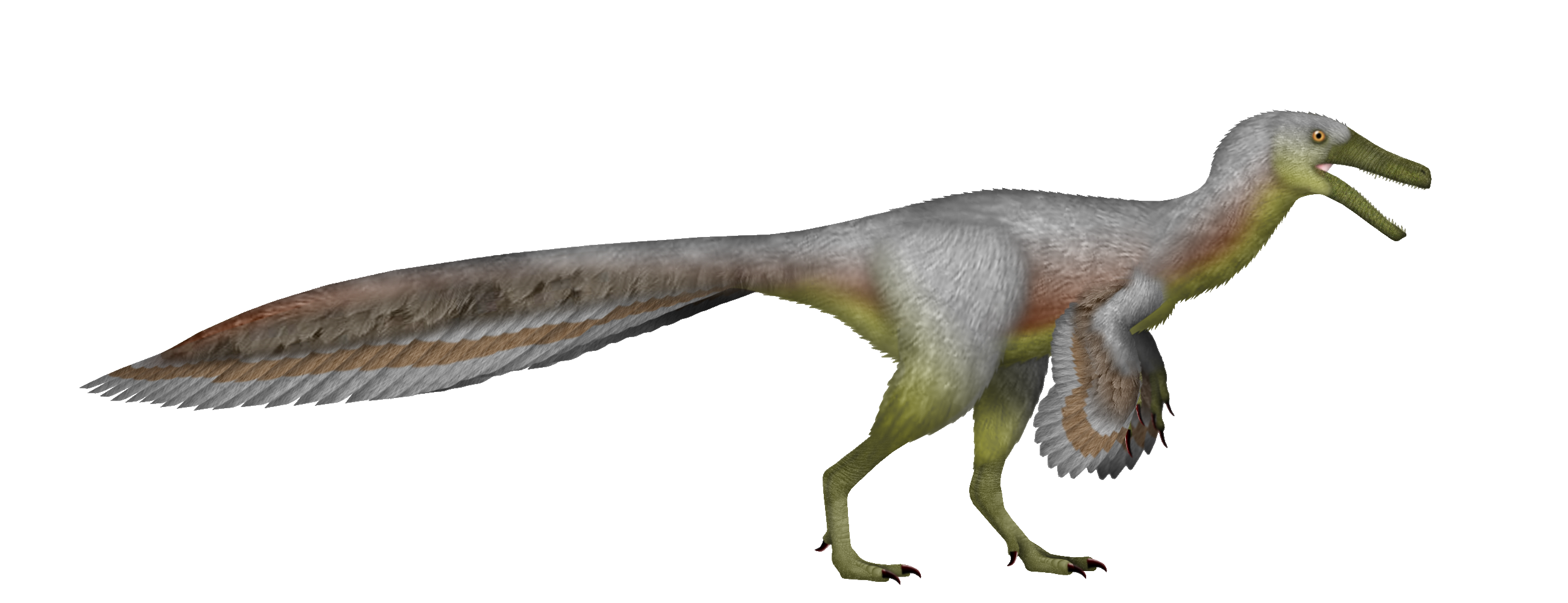
Hypothetical life restoration as a unenlagiine

Before Imperobator was officially described, a paper published in 2007 announced the specimen and assigned it to the clade Dromaeosauridae; it was nicknamed the "Naze dromaeosaur". This was problematic as UCMP 276000 lacked multiple characteristics of dromaeosaurids, including a prominent sickle claw. The paper naming and describing Imperobator assigned it only to the clade Paraves, with their phylogenetic analyses recovering this taxon as related to smaller members of the group:

- Paraves
  - Anchiornis
  - Eosinopteryx
  - Pedopenna
  - Imperobator
  - - Xiaotingia
    - Aurornis
  - Troodontidae
  - Dromaeosauridae
  - Avialae

In a modified version of the large phylogenetic analysis of Theropoda by Hartman et al. (2019), Imperobator was recovered as a basal member of the Deinonychosauria outside of Dromaeosauridae, Unenlagiinae and Troodontidae.

In 2024, the describers of the unenlagiine Diuqin considered Imperobator as a possible unenlagiine. A detailed re-analysis of Imperobator was published independently in 2025 by Motta and colleagues. In all variations of their phylogenetic analyses, Imperobator was recovered as a member of the Unenlagiinae. They identified new synapomorphies of the clade as well, such as the presence of a sub-arctometatarsalian metatarsus. The results of their pruned consensus tree under Extended Implied Weighting are displayed in the cladogram below:

- Paraves
  - - Anchiornithidae
    - Avialae
  - Deinonychosauria
    - Troodontidae
    - - Dromaeosauridae
        - Microraptoria
        - Eudromaeosauria
      - Unenlagiinia
        - Halszkaraptor
        - - Mahakala
          - Unenlagiidae
            - - Rahonavis
              - Overoraptor
            - - Buitreraptor
              - - Imperobator
                - - Neuquenraptor — Unenlagia
                  - Pamparaptor

== Paleoenvironment ==
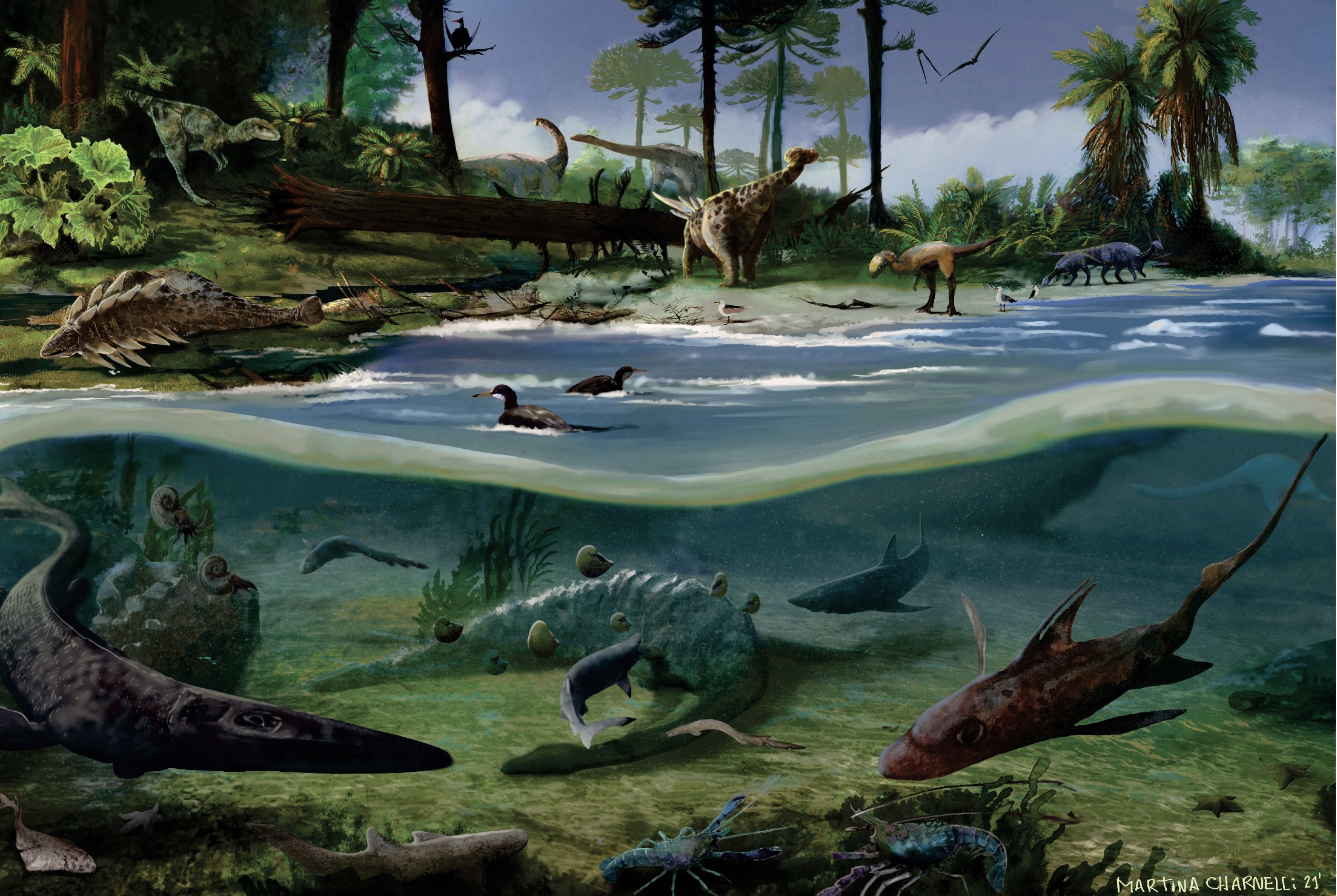
Reconstruction of the Snow Hill Island Formation's flora and fauna, with Imperobator in the left background.

Imperobator is known solely from the Cape Lamb Member of the Snow Hill Island Formation in James Ross Island, an island in the James Ross Island group on the northeastern edge of the Antarctic Peninsula. The Snow Hill Island Formation is one of only two major dinosaur-bearing rock formations found on Antarctica, bearing all but two of the continent's named dinosaurs. The floral composition, habitat, and climate are of one similar to modern high latitude volcanic arches. During the time in which Imperobator lived, Earth's climate was warmer and more humid than it is today and as a result the Antarctic Peninsula was without large ice sheets. The environment was dominated by Gondwanan subpolar conifer-angiosperm forests. The animals inhabiting Antarctica at this time would still have had to endure long periods of darkness and likely freezing temperatures during the winter, much like in modern-day Antarctica.

Imperobator's fossils bear some surface weathering and abrasion, which indicate that they have gone through minimal transport, reworking, and sub-aerial weathering. This is in contrast to the holotype of the ankylosaur Antarctopelta, which likely floated out to sea and was buried by marine sediments on the ocean floor. From the site in which Imperobator was found, pollen grains from Asteraceae, the group containing sunflowers and daisies, are the oldest records of the family that were collected. Some of the environment may have been wet and similar to peat bogs, as evidenced by Sphagnaceae (peat mosses) and several other groups like the clubmoss Selaginella, the firmoss group Lycopodiaceae, and the clade Ericaceae. The Cape Lamb Member of the formation has yielded several other fossil remains, such as the herbivorous ornithopod Morrosaurus, an indeterminate hypsilophodontid ornithopod, the avian Antarcticavis, an indeterminate neornithine, an unnamed pterosaur, the elasmosaurid Vegasaurus; the mosasaurs Taniwhasaurus, Liodon, Plioplatecarpus, and Mosasaurus, sharks such as Notidanodon, and several bony fishes from the groups Teleostei, Actinopterygii, Ichthyodectiformes, and Sphenocephalidae. Shelled ammonites, a kind of aquatic, shelled cephalopod, are found in the layers of the Cape Lamb Member.
