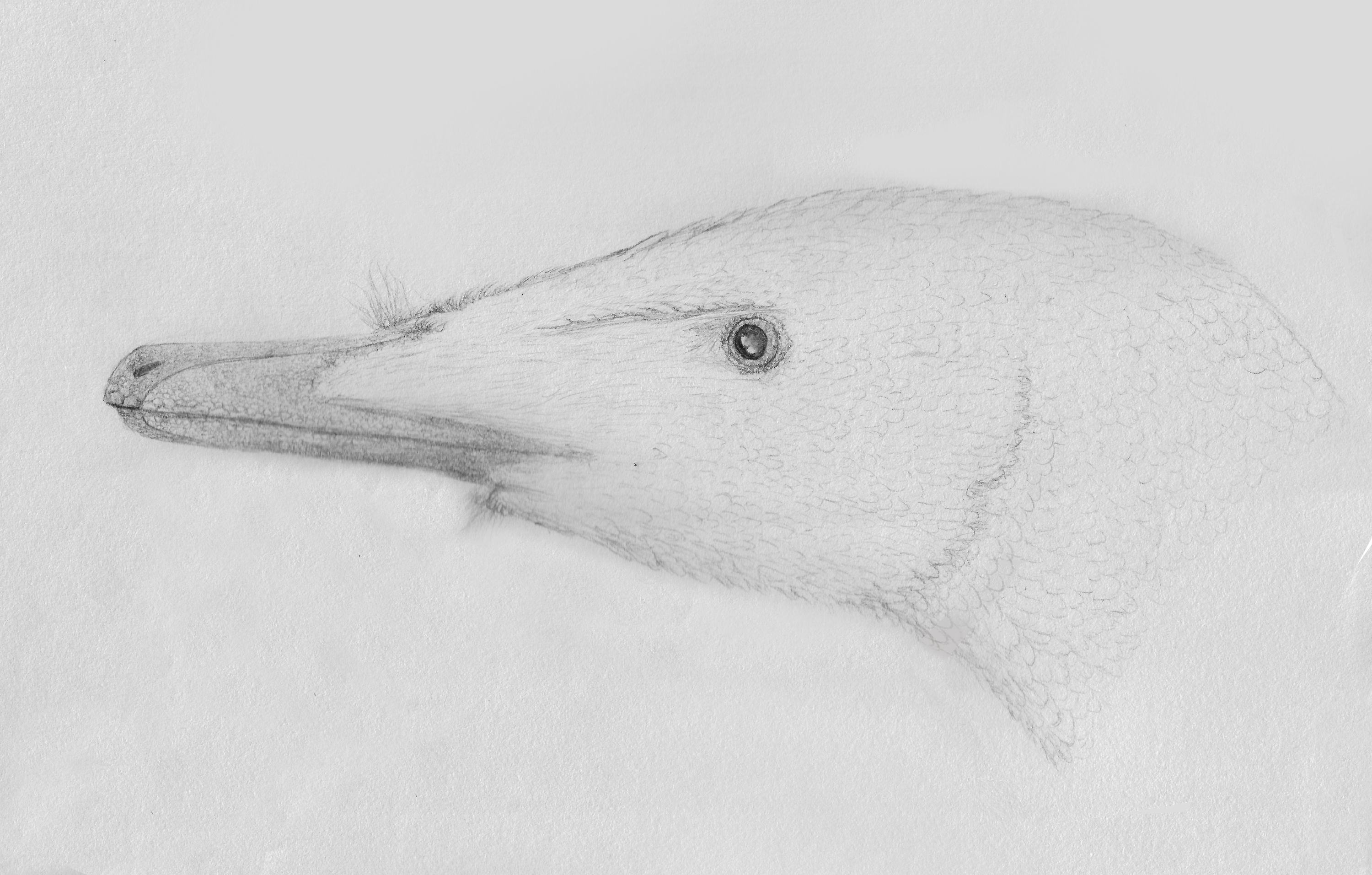
- Restoration of head

Scientific classification
- Kingdom: Animalia
- Phylum: Chordata
- Class: Reptilia
- Clade: Dinosauria
- Clade: Saurischia
- Clade: Theropoda
- Family: †Dromaeosauridae
- Subfamily: †Unenlagiinae
- Genus: †Ypupiara; Brum et al., 2021
- Species: †Y. lopai

Binomial name
- †Ypupiara lopai Brum et al., 2021

= Ypupiara =

Ypupiara Temporal range: Late Cretaceous, Maastrichtian

Genus of unenlagiine theropod

Ypupiara (meaning "the one who lives in the water") is an extinct genus of unenlagiine theropod from the Late Cretaceous Serra da Galga Formation of Brazil. It was the first member of the Dromaeosauridae to be discovered in South America and the first member of the Unenlagiinae to be discovered, but not the first to be identified as such. The type and only species, Y. lopai, is known solely from a specimen that was destroyed in a fire in 2018.

== Discovery and naming ==
The holotype, DGM 921-R, a right maxilla and dentary (which was associated with a fish jaw), was discovered in a layer of the Late Cretaceous Serra da Galga Formation of Brazil. It was found by Alberto Lopa sometime in the 1950s, possibly in 1957, after which Llewellyn Ivor Price listed the fossil as belonging to an indeterminate vertebrate. The specimen was then placed in storage at the National Museum of Brazil and was not acknowledged again for another 80 years.

Photographs of the holotype were taken shortly before it was destroyed when the museum it was housed in was heavily damaged in a fire on 2 September 2018. Holgado et al. (2018) recognised DGM 921-R as belonging to a new genus of unenlagiine theropods, and the paper naming and describing the holotype was due to be submitted around the same time as the fire that destroyed the fossil, but was delayed because of the fire and the species was not named and described until 2021. The generic name, Ypupiara, is derived from a Tupi word meaning "the one who lives in the water," in reference to a local mythological creature and its inferred diet of fish. The specific name, lopai, honors the holotype's discoverer.

During the 1950s, a single metatarsus belonging to a dromaeosaurid was discovered by Alberto Lopa. This specimen, known as "Lopasaurus" (meaning "Alberto Lopa's lizard"), was lost sometime after the death of Llewellyn Ivor Price in 1980. It was acknowledged by Brum et al. (2021), where they tentatively referred "Lopasaurus" to the Unenlagiinae, but they could not determine whether "Lopasaurus" represents the same taxon as Ypupiara, due to the lack of overlapping material.

== Description ==
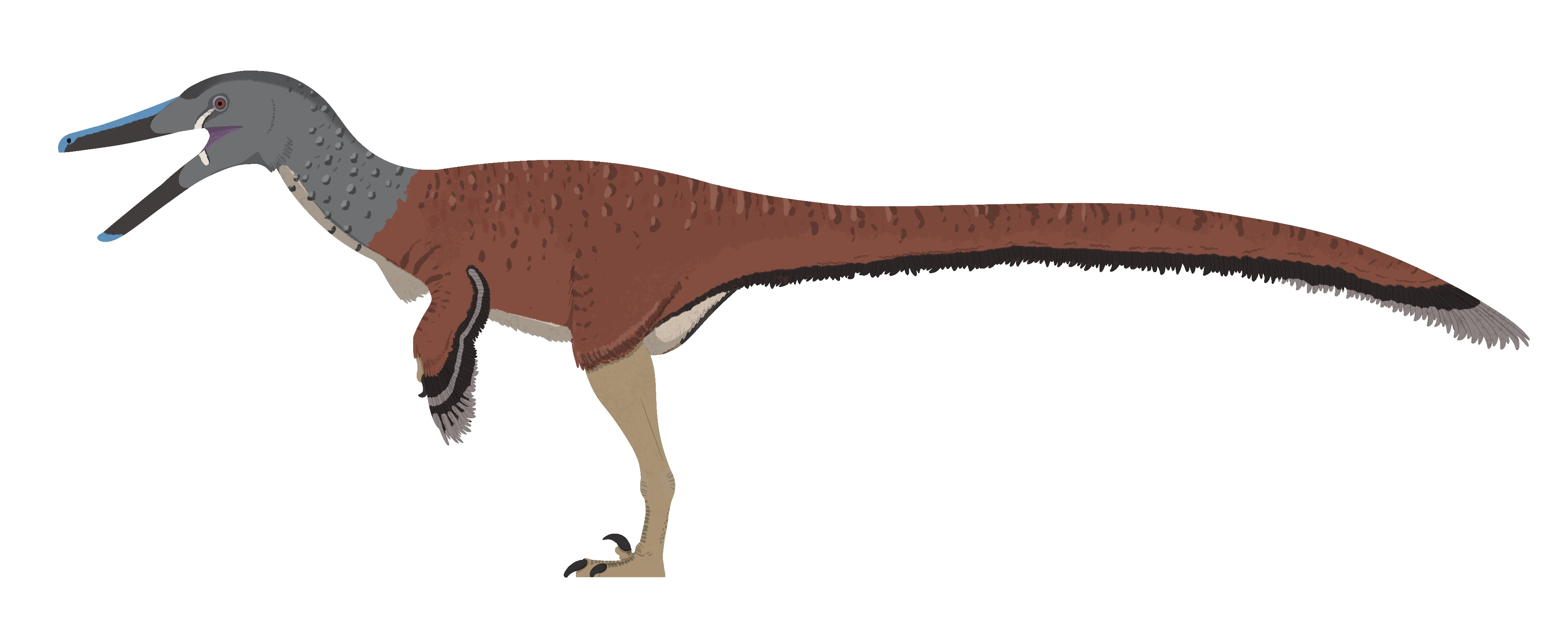
Life restoration

The describers of Ypuparia suggested that unenlagiines such as Ypupiara and its sister taxon Austroraptor likely consumed fish for a considerable part of their diet, based on their non-serrated conical teeth that are similar to those of other piscivorous tetrapods including gavialoid crocodylians, spinosaurid theropods, and anhanguerid pterosaurs.

== Classification ==
For the 80 years before it was described, Ypupiara was classified as an indeterminate vertebrate. It was not until it was described in 2021 by Brum et al. when it was recognised as a theropod belonging to the Unenlagiinae. Ypupiara was found to be the sister taxon to Austroraptor.

- Unenlagiinia
  - Halszkaraptorinae
  - Unenlagiinae
    - - Buitreraptor
      - Neuquenraptor
      - Unenlagia comahuensis
      - Unenlagia paynemili
    - - Austroraptor
      - Ypupiara
