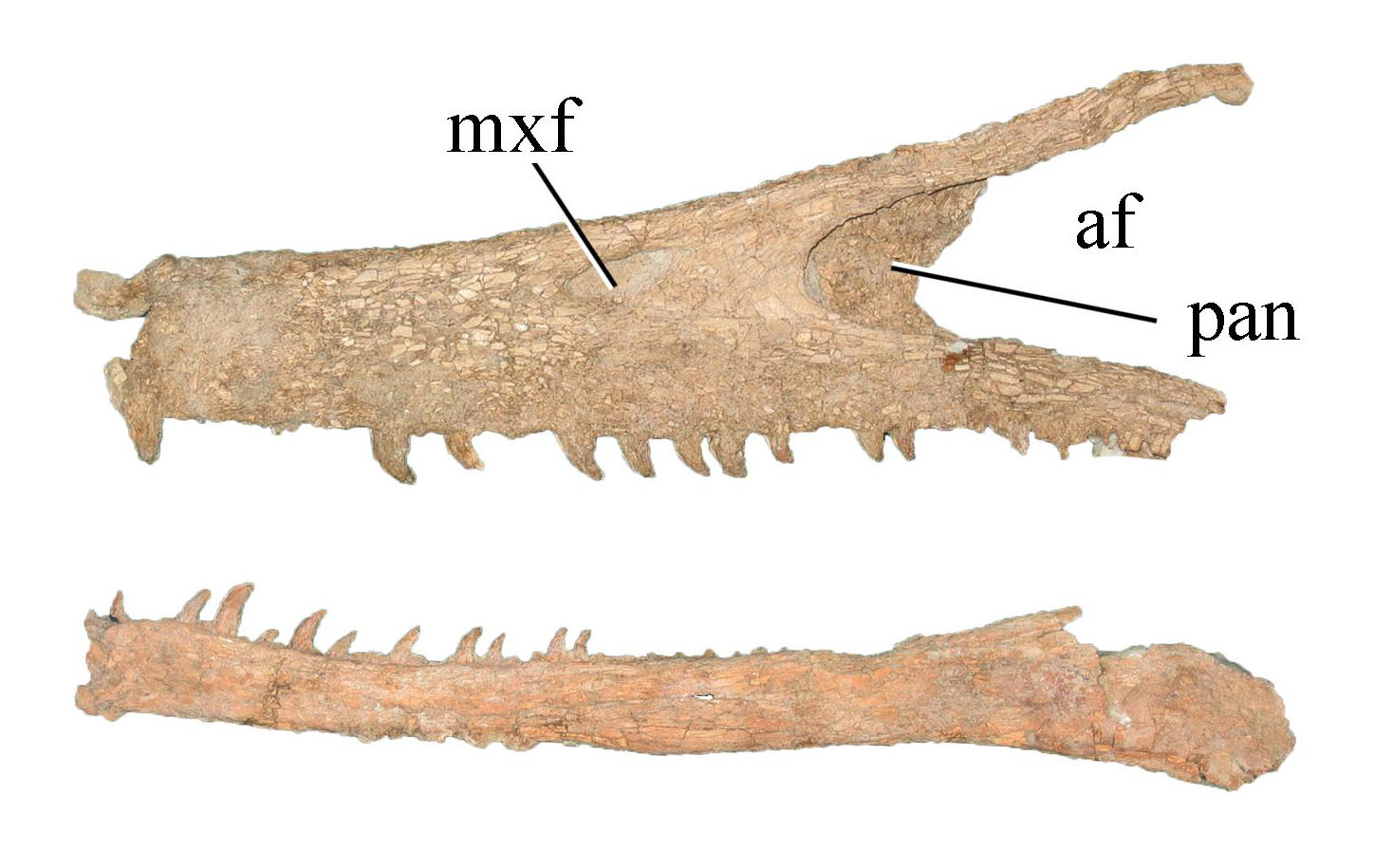
- Maxilla and dentary of the holotype

Scientific classification
- Kingdom: Animalia
- Phylum: Chordata
- Class: Reptilia
- Clade: Dinosauria
- Clade: Saurischia
- Clade: Theropoda
- Clade: Paraves
- Subfamily: †Unenlagiinae
- Genus: †Austroraptor; Novas et al., 2008
- Species: †A. cabazai

Binomial name
- †Austroraptor cabazai Novas et al., 2008

= Austroraptor =

Austroraptor Temporal range: Late Cretaceous, 76.5–68 Ma

Genus of theropod dinosaurs

Austroraptor (/ˌɔːstroʊˈræptər/ AW-stroh-RAP-tər) is a genus of paravian dinosaur in the clade Unenlagiinae known from the Late Cretaceous (Campanian–Maastrichtian ages) Allen Formation of Argentina.

Austroraptor was a large, moderately-built, ground-dwelling, bipedal carnivore, measuring around 5–6 m (16–20 ft) long and weighing up to 300–520 kilograms (660–1,150 lb). It is one of the largest paravians known, with only large dromaeosaurids such as Achillobator and Utahraptor approaching a similar size, and if unenlagiines are recovered as avialans then it would be the longest avialan known.

== Discovery and naming ==
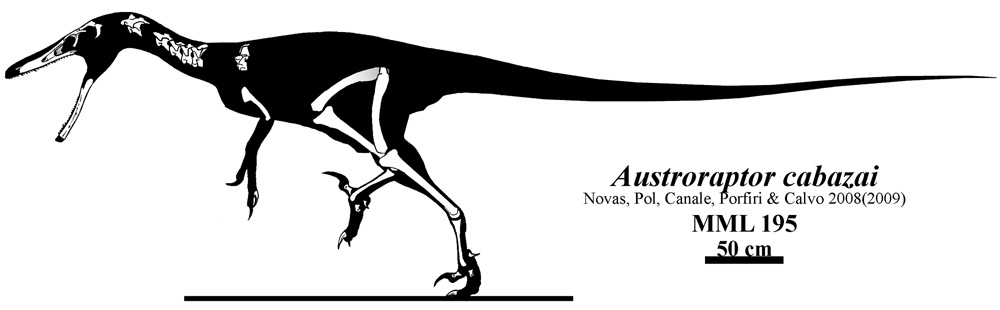
Skeletal restoration showing the preserved bones of the holotype

The type specimen of Austroraptor cabazai, holotype MML-195, was recovered in the Bajo de Santa Rosa locality of the Allen Formation, in Río Negro, Argentina. The specimen was collected in 2002 by the team of Fernando Emilio Novas of the Museo Argentino de Ciencias Naturales. It consists of a fragmentary skeleton including parts of the skull, lower jaw, a few neck and torso vertebrae, some ribs, a humerus, and assorted bones from both legs. The specimen was prepared by Marcelo Pablo Isasi and Santiago Reuil. In 2008, the type species Austroraptor cabazai was named and described by Fernando Emilio Novas, Diego Pol, Juan Canale, Juan Porfiri and Jorge Calvo. The genus name Austroraptor means "Southern Thief," and is derived from the Latin word auster meaning "the south wind" and the Latin word raptor meaning "thief." The specific name cabazai was chosen in honor of Héctor "Tito" Cabaza, who founded the Museo Municipal de Lamarque where the specimen was partially studied.

In 2012, Phil Currie and Ariana Paulina-Carabajal referred a second specimen to Austroraptor cabazai, MML-220, that was found in 2008. This specimen, a partial skeleton with the skull of an adult individual slightly smaller than the holotype, is also housed in the collection of the Museo Municipal de Lamarque in Argentina. It complements the holotype in several elements, mainly the lower arm, hand and foot.

== Description ==
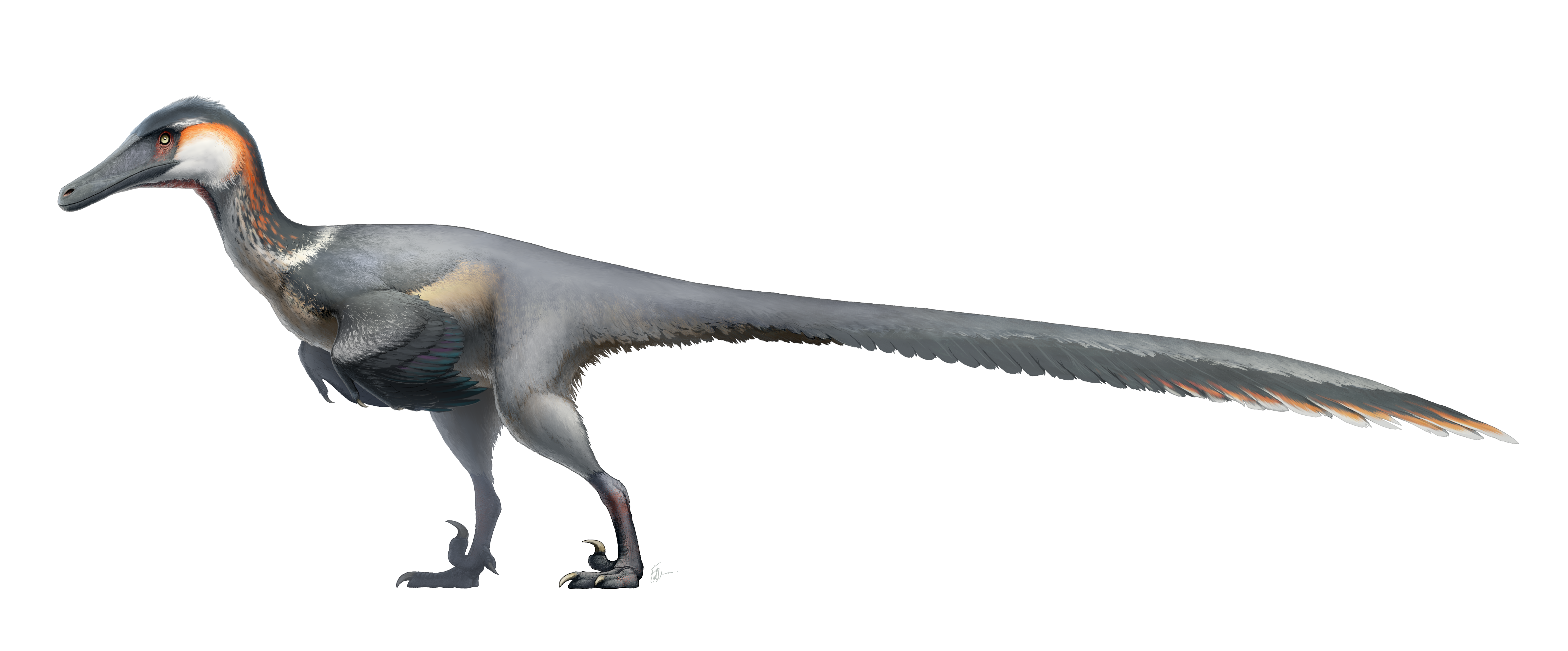
Life restoration

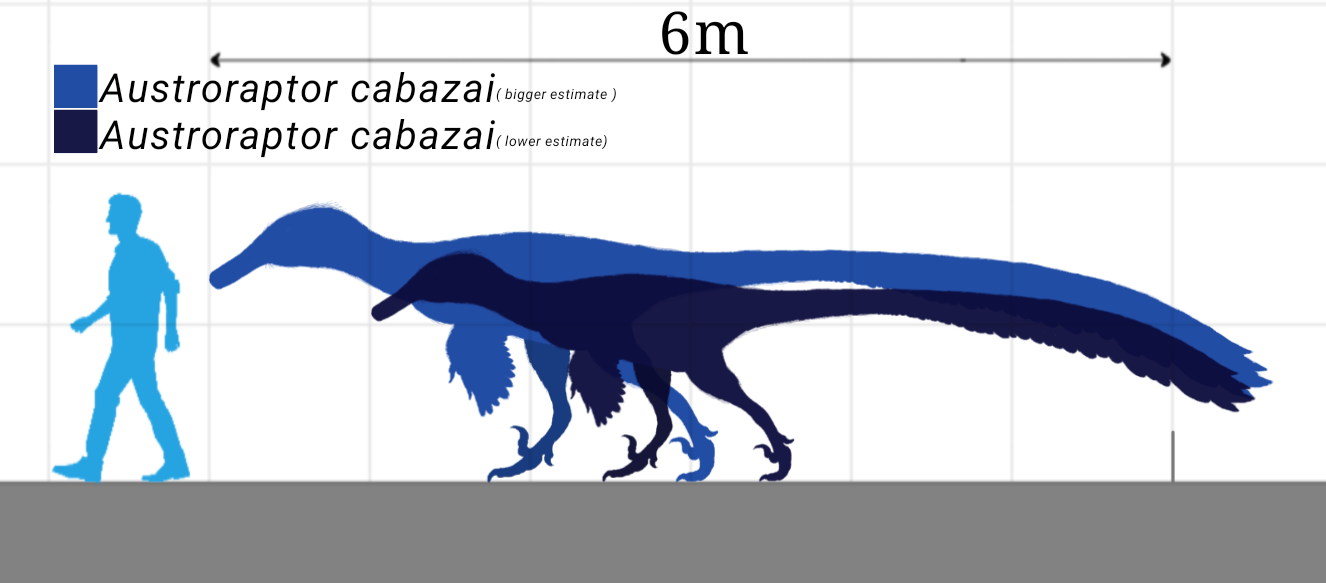
Size comparison

It is the largest dromaeosaur to be discovered in the Southern Hemisphere; Novas et al. estimated that Austroraptor measured 5 m (16 ft) in length from head to tail and weighed 368 kg (811 lb). Gregory S. Paul later estimated its length at 6 m (20 ft) and weight of 300 kg (660 lb). In 2014, Benson and colleagues estimated that Austroraptor weighed up to 520 kg (1,150 lb).

The skull is low and elongated, much more so than that of other dromaeosaurs, and measures 80 cm (31 in). Austroraptor has conical, non-serrated teeth, which Novas et al. compared to those of spinosaurids, based on how the enamel of the surface of its teeth is fluted. Austroraptor shares a trait that is unique to it and to Adasaurus: the descending process of the lacrimal bones curves anteriorly to a large degree. Austroraptor has a bizarre morphology in its toes, which are strangely disproportionate. The 4th toe is over twice the width of the 2nd toe, and nearly three times the expected width based on similarly sized members of its taxonomic family. This has suggested to some researchers that the holotype specimen is a paleontological chimera; however, there is no uncertainty about the affinity of the taxon, so a chimera hypothesis can not be assured.

Several of Austroraptor's skull bones bear some resemblance to those of the smaller troodontids. The front limbs of Austroraptor were short for a dromaeosaur, with its humerus less than half the length of its femur. Among the Dromaeosauridae, only this genus, Tianyuraptor, Zhenyuanlong and Mahakala have similarly reduced forelimbs. The relative length of its arms has caused Austroraptor to be compared to another, more famous short-armed dinosaur, Tyrannosaurus, though there is no close relationship between the two taxa.

=== Distinguishing traits ===
However little of the entire skeleton was found, the bones that are available for analysis possess some distinct characteristics that differentiate Austroraptor from other dromaeosaurs. Austroraptor is particularly notable because of its relatively short forearms, which are much shorter in proportion when compared to the majority of the members of Dromaeosauridae. According to Novas et al. 2008, Austroraptor can be distinguished based on the following characteristics:

- A lacrimal that is highly pneumatized, with the descending process strongly curved rostrally, and with a caudal process flaring out horizontally above the orbit.
- The lack of a dorsomedial process on the postorbital bone for articulation with the frontal bone, and with the squamosal process extremely reduced.
- The maxillary and dentary teeth are small, conical, devoid of serrations and fluted.
- The humerus is short, at approximately 46% of length of the femur.
- The pedal phalanx II-2 is transversely narrow, contrasting with the extremely robust phalanx IV-2. (Note: This condition differs from that Laurasian Dromaeosaurids, but is unknown for other Unenlagiines) (Note: A condition also observed in Buitreraptor) (Note: A smaller ratio than in other Dromaeosaurids and Paravians) (Note: This condition differs from that of other Dromaeosaurids including Unenlagiines, but resembles the condition observed in advanced Troodontids)

In 2012, comparison with a second specimen showed that the fourth toe was not especially broad; the purported second phalanx had in fact been a first phalanx.

== Classification ==
A cladistic analysis of the holotype specimen's anatomical features by the describers placed Austroraptor within the subfamily Unenlagiinae of Dromaeosauridae. This assignment was based on characteristics observed in the bones of the skull, the teeth, and the geometry and formation of the specimen's vertebral elements. It was determined that Austroraptor was a close relative of the unenlagiine dromaeosaur Buitreraptor, with which it shares certain derived characteristics of the neck vertebrae.

The following cladogram is based on the phylogenetic analysis conducted by Turner, Makovicky and Norell in 2012, showing the relationships of Austroraptor among the other genera assigned to the taxon Unenlagiinae:

- Unenlagiinae
  - Rahonavis
  - - Buitreraptor
    - - Austroraptor
      - Unenlagia

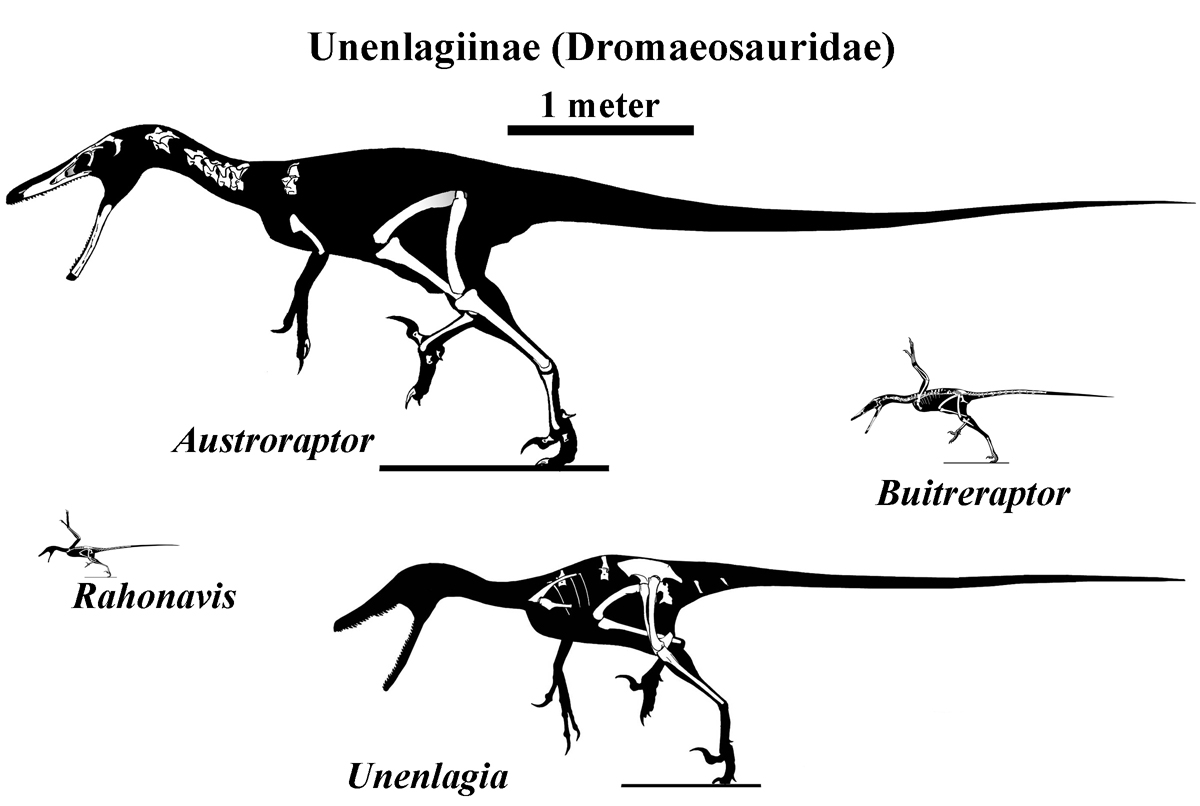
Austroraptor compared to other unenlagiine genera

Cau et al. 2017 published a phylogenetic analysis of the Dromaeosauridae during the description of Halszkaraptor, in which members of the Unenlagiinae are classified as:

- Unenlagiinae
  - Austroraptor
  - - Buitreraptor
    - Unenlagia comahuensis
    - Unenlagia paynemili
    - Neuquenraptor

In 2019, during the description of Hesperornithoides, many paravian groups were examined for the inclusion of the new genus. In this analysis, Austroraptor is found to be a more basal member of Unenlagiinae.

- Unenlagiinae
  - Austroraptor
  - - Buitreraptor
    - - - - Pyroraptor
          - Pamparaptor
        - - - - Rahonavis
              - Ornithodesmus
            - - Dakotaraptor
              - Unenlagia

In 2021, Brum and colleagues classified Ypupiara as a sister taxon to Austroraptor.

- Unenlagiinia
  - Halszkaraptorinae
  - Unenlagiinae
    - - Buitreraptor
      - Neuquenraptor
      - Unenlagia comahuensis
      - Unenlagia paynemili
    - - Austroraptor
      - Ypupiara

== Paleobiology ==
It has been suggested that unenlagiines had better capacities for running and pursuit predation than other dromaeosaurids. While Laurasian dromaeosaurids (Eudromaeosauria) were more stocky and had shorter legs and had an active predatory lifestyle, unenlagiines could likely maintain high speeds for extended amounts of time because they were more gracile. Unenlagiines have modified metatarsals that resemble those of microraptorines: they are relatively thin and lengthened. Based on these adaptations, it is likely that unenlagiines preyed on small, fast animals, although the exact animals are unknown. Buitreraptor features particular traits that can be attributed to specific hunting methods.

Models for Buitreraptor propose that it hunted by traveling large distances in pursuit of prey, which may explain the long-legged trait shared by various genera of Unenlagiidae. Buitreraptor is characterized by its long forelimbs and hands; it likely relied on them to restrain prey and the curved claw of the second pedal digit would have injured or killed the victim. Buitreraptor probably swallowed its prey whole due to its lack of serrated teeth with flesh-tearing capabilities; the teeth functioned to simply hold prey.

The same model was proposed for the much larger Austroraptor with few exceptions:

- It would not have used its arms to handle prey, due to their relatively small size.
- Its teeth were conical and probably stronger, so it may have been able to use them for hunting larger prey.

The teeth of Austroraptor are conical and lacking denticles, similarly to those of spinosaurids. Since it probably had a subarctometatarsal condition and similar hindlimb lengths compared to Buitreraptor, Austroraptor likely had well-developed cursorial capacities. In 2021, Brum and colleagues suggested that unenlagiines such as Austroraptor and its sister taxon Ypupiara likely consumed fish for a considerable part of their diet, possibly even as a main food source, based on their non-serrated conical teeth that are similar to those of piscivorous tetrapods including gavialoids, spinosaurids, anhanguerids, etc.

== Paleoecology ==
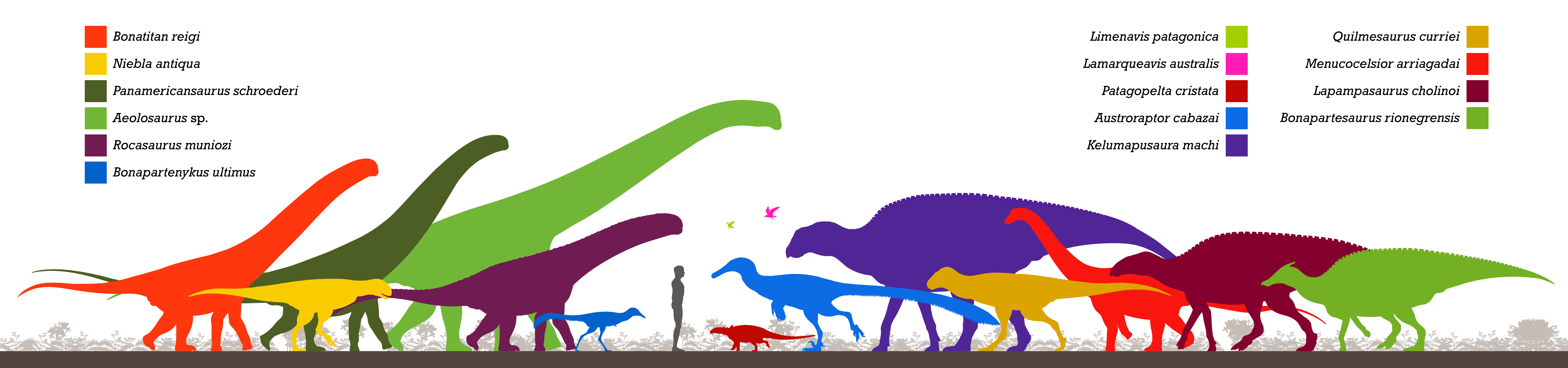
Contemporaneous known fauna from the Allen Formation (Austroraptor in blue, right)

The holotype specimen was found in terrestrial sediments that were deposited during the Campanian–Maastrichtian stage of the Late Cretaceous period. Thomas R. Holtz Jr. has estimated that Austroraptor lived between 78 million and 66 million years ago, until the end of the Mesozoic era. Austroraptor shared its paleoenvironment in the Allen Formation with diverse dinosaurs and early mammals. The discovery of Austroraptor increases the understanding of ecological and morphological diversity among unenlagiines, demonstrating that members of the subfamily included giant short-armed and small long-armed members, and suggesting that during the end of the Cretaceous large coelurosaurs became common after the decreasing dominance of carcharodontosaurids. This genus represents the earliest record of Gondwanan dromaeosaurids, and supports the fact that large dromaeosaurids took the role of large predators alongside abelisaurids such as Quilmesaurus, Aucasaurus and Carnotaurus.

During his description of Pellegrinisaurus, Salgado suggested that large titanosaurs and theropods inhabited interior environments of the region, and contemporaneous hadrosaurids and the titanosaur Aeolosaurus inhabited coastal lowlands. The diversity among titanosaurs indicates that the Allen Formation had environments that supported a great range of herbivorous dinosaurs. Other contemporaneous paleofauna includes the titanosaurs Laplatasaurus, Rocasaurus and Saltasaurus, the bird Limenavis, and the hadrosaurids Bonapartesaurus, Kelumapusaura, and Lapampasaurus.

== See also ==
- Allen Formation
- Timeline of dromaeosaurid research
- 2008 in paleontology
