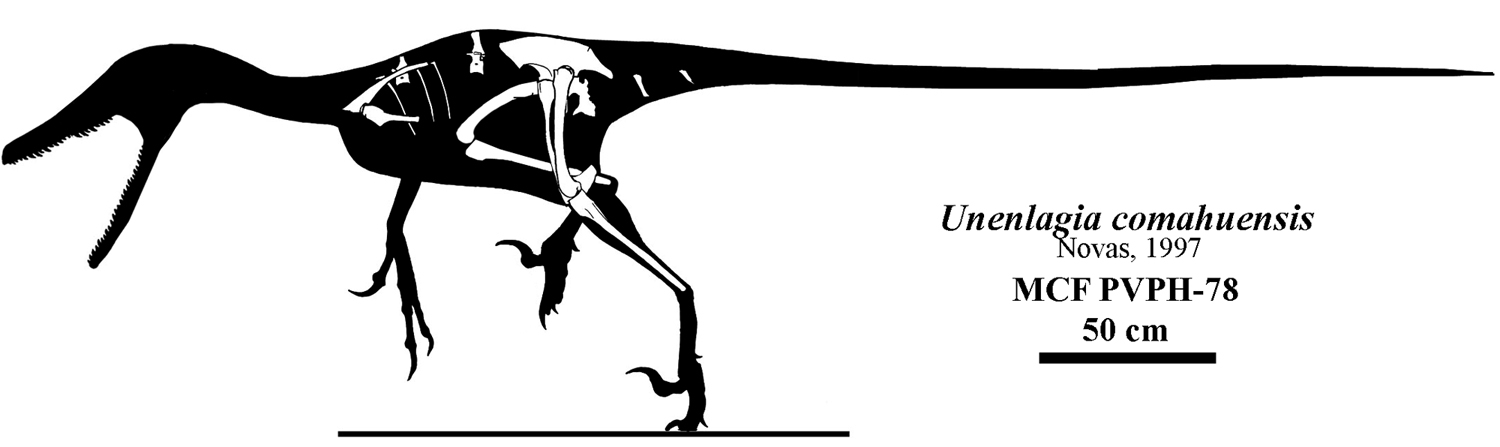
- Illustration of known material of U. comahuensis

Scientific classification
- Kingdom: Animalia
- Phylum: Chordata
- Class: Reptilia
- Clade: Dinosauria
- Clade: Saurischia
- Clade: Theropoda
- Subfamily: †Unenlagiinae
- Genus: †Unenlagia; Novas & Puerta, 1997

Species
- †U. comahuensis Novas & Puerta, 1997 (type); †U. paynemili Calvo, Porfiri & Kellner, 2004

= Unenlagia =

Unenlagia Temporal range: Late Cretaceous ~89 Ma

Extinct genus of dinosaurs

Unenlagia (meaning "half-bird" in Latinized Mapudungun) is a genus of unenlagiine theropod dinosaur that lived in South America during the Late Cretaceous period. The genus Unenlagia has been assigned two species: U. comahuensis, the type species described by Novas and Puerta in 1997, and U. paynemili, described by Calvo et al. in 2004.

== Discovery and naming ==
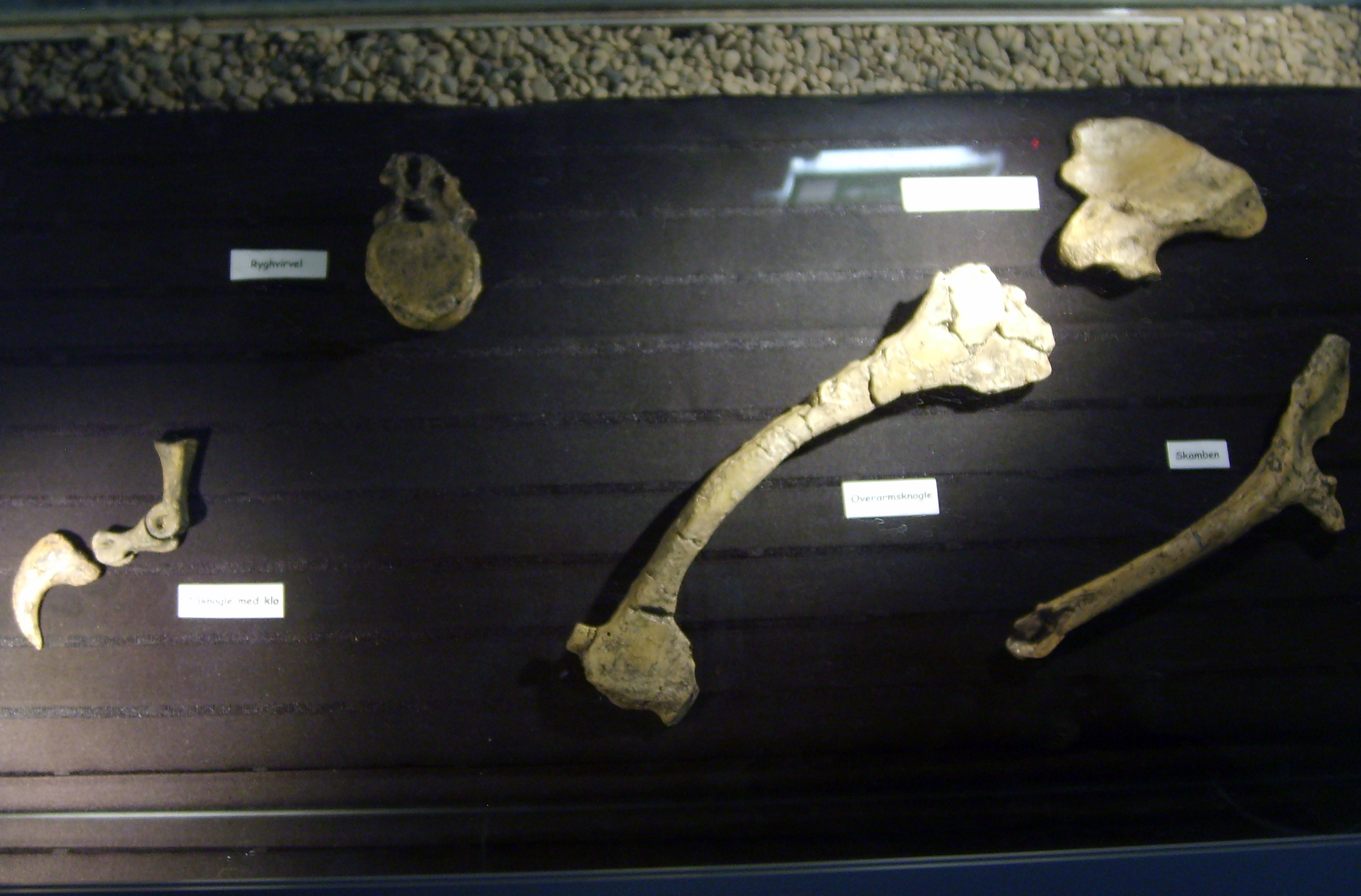
Casts of U. paynemili fossils; today the claw is considered one of the hand unguals, not of the foot as shown here

In 1996 in the Neuquén province of Argentina a skeleton of a theropod was discovered in the Sierra del Portezuelo and reported the same year. In 1997 Fernando Emilio Novas and Pablo Puerta named and described Unenlagia comahuensis. The generic name is derived from Mapuche uñùm, 'bird', and llag, 'half', in reference to the fact that the describers considered the species to be a link between birds and more basal theropods. The specific name refers to the Comahue, the region the find was made.

The holotype specimen, MCF PVPH 78, was uncovered in layers of the Portezuelo Formation dating to the Coniacian. It consists of a partial skeleton lacking the skull but including vertebrae, a sacrum, ribs, chevrons, a scapula, a humerus, a partial pelvis, a femur and a tibia.

In 2002 near the Lago Barreales a second skeleton was uncovered and reported in 2003. In 2004 it was named and described by Jorge Calvo, Juan Porfiri and Alexander Kellner as a second species: Unenlagia paynemili. The specific name honours Maximino Paynemil, the chief of the Paynemil community. The holotype is MUCPv-349, a partial skeleton consisting of a humerus and two pubes. Several paratypes were also assigned: MUCPv-343, a claw; MUCPv-409, a partial ilium; MUCPv-415, a phalanx and MUCPv-416, a vertebra.

Some researchers consider Neuquenraptor to be a junior subjective synonym of Unenlagia.

== Description ==
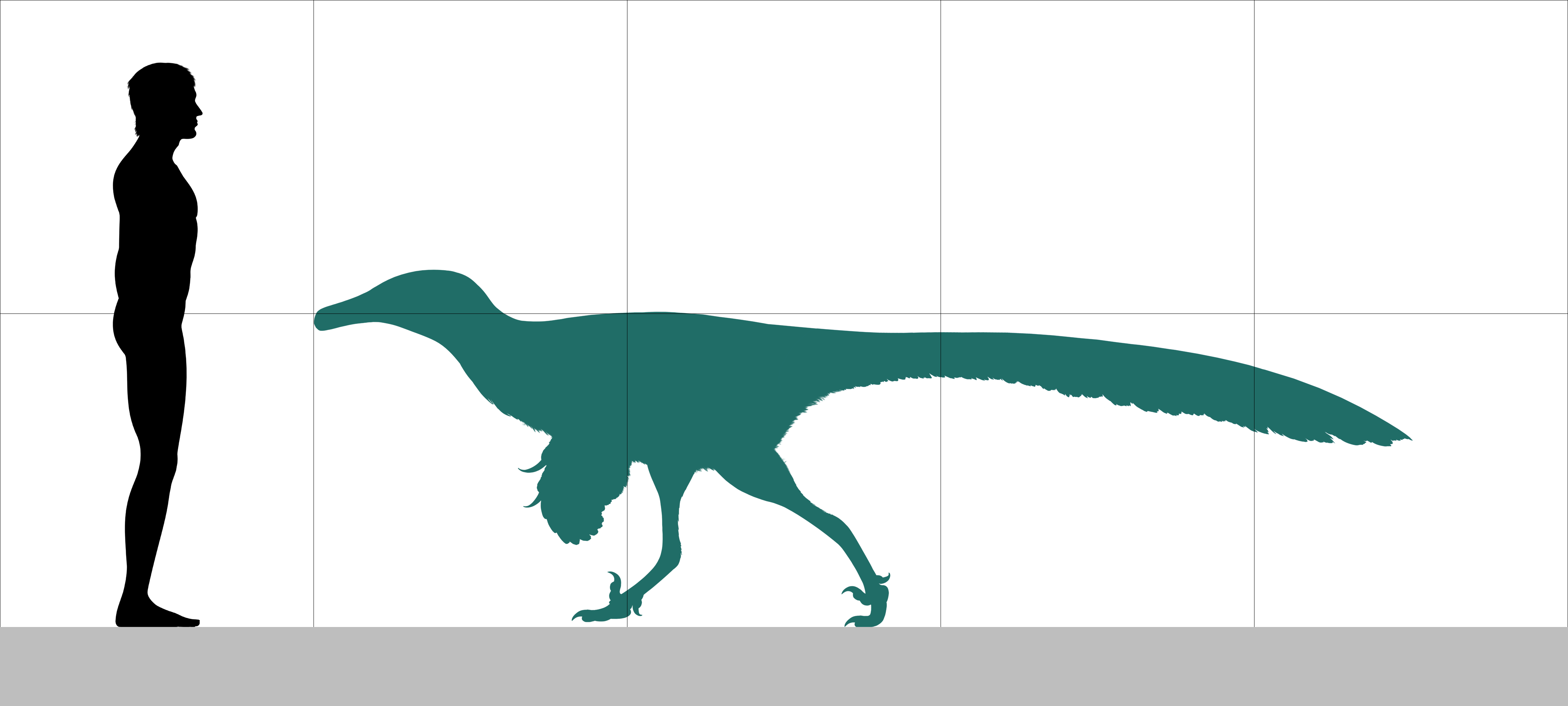
Size comparison with a 1.7 m tall human

The body length of Unenlagia has been disputed, due to the fact that only the leg length is well known and it is uncertain whether this should be extrapolated using the proportions of the low-slung Dromaeosauridae or the long-legged basal birds. Estimates have thus varied between a length of 3.5 m (11 ft) and a weight of 75 kg (165 lb) on the one hand, and a length of just 2 m (6.6 ft) on the other. However, Thomas Holtz has estimated Unenlagia at 2.3 m (7.5 ft) long and 9.1-22.7 kg (20-50 lbs) in weight. The describers of Austroraptor estimated that Unenlagia reached over 3.2 metres (10 ft) long and weighed about 95 kilograms (209 lb). Likewise, the interpretation of the head form has changed from a shorter-snouted dromaeosaurid condition to the elongated shape known from the later discovered related genera Buitreraptor and Austroraptor.

Life restoration of U. comahuensis

Novas and Puerta found that the pelvic region of Unenlagia, especially the form of the ilium, was very similar to that of the early bird Archaeopteryx. The shoulder girdle of Unenlagia was originally interpreted as if it was adapted for flapping, with a flat scapula positioned on top of the ribcage, making the shoulder joint point more laterally. However, in 2002 Kenneth Carpenter pointed out that this would imply that the shoulder-blade was dorsoventrally flattened instead of laterally as with other theropods and that it thus were more likely the scapula was located on the side of the ribcage. This conformed to a later hypothesis by Philip Senter that non-avian theropods like Unenlagia were unable to lift their forelimbs above their back, as even would still have been the case for the basalmost bird Archaeopteryx. South American workers have remained unconvinced though, countering that a laterally positioned scapula would make the coracoid of Unenlagia jut into its ribcage, which seems anatomically implausible.

== Classification ==
Novas and Puerta in the original description considered Unenlagia a sister taxon of the birds, which would make it a basal member of the Avialae sensu Gauthier 1986.

However, in 1999 Mark Norell and Peter Makovicky stated that Unenlagia was a member of the Dromaeosauridae. Unenlagia would have belonged to the extremely bird-like Gondwanan clade of dromaeosaurids called the Unenlagiinae, and be closely related to species such as Buitreraptor and Neuquenraptor (which might be the same species as Unenlagia). Makovicky et al. in 2005 also recovered the 'flying raptor' Rahonavis as a member of this group, which would mean that either Unenlagia is secondarily flightless, having evolved from flying, Rahonavis-like ancestors, or that bird-like flight evolved at least twice. Norell et al. in 2006 also found Rahonavis to be the sister taxon of Unenlagia.

This position has not been unanimously accepted. In 2011 Novas and Federico Agnolín published a study in which a Unenlagiidae was positioned within Avialae.

Below is a cladogram conducted by Hartman et al. 2019, in which Unenlagia is found to be a more derived member alongside Dakotaraptor:

- Unenlagiinae
  - Austroraptor
  - - Buitreraptor
    - - Pyroraptor
      - Pamparaptor
      - - Rahonavis
        - - Dakotaraptor
          - Unenlagia

This cladogram is from Motta et al., 2020, showing Unenlagia being more derived than traditional dromaeosaurids:

- Paraves
  - Troodontidae
  - Eumaniraptora
    - Dromaeosauridae
    - - Microraptoria
      - - Unenlagiidae
          - Austroraptor
          - Buitreraptor
          - Unenlagia
        - - - Overoraptor
            - Rahonavis
          - Avialae
            - Archaeopterygidae
              - Alcmonavis
              - - Wellnhoferia
                - Archaeopteryx
            - - Anchiornithidae
                - Xiaotingia
                - Anchiornis
              - - Jeholornis
                - Pygostylia

== See also ==
- Timeline of dromaeosaurid research
- Origin of birds
- Unenlagia in the Dino Directory
- Discussion of unenlagiine relationships on the DML.
