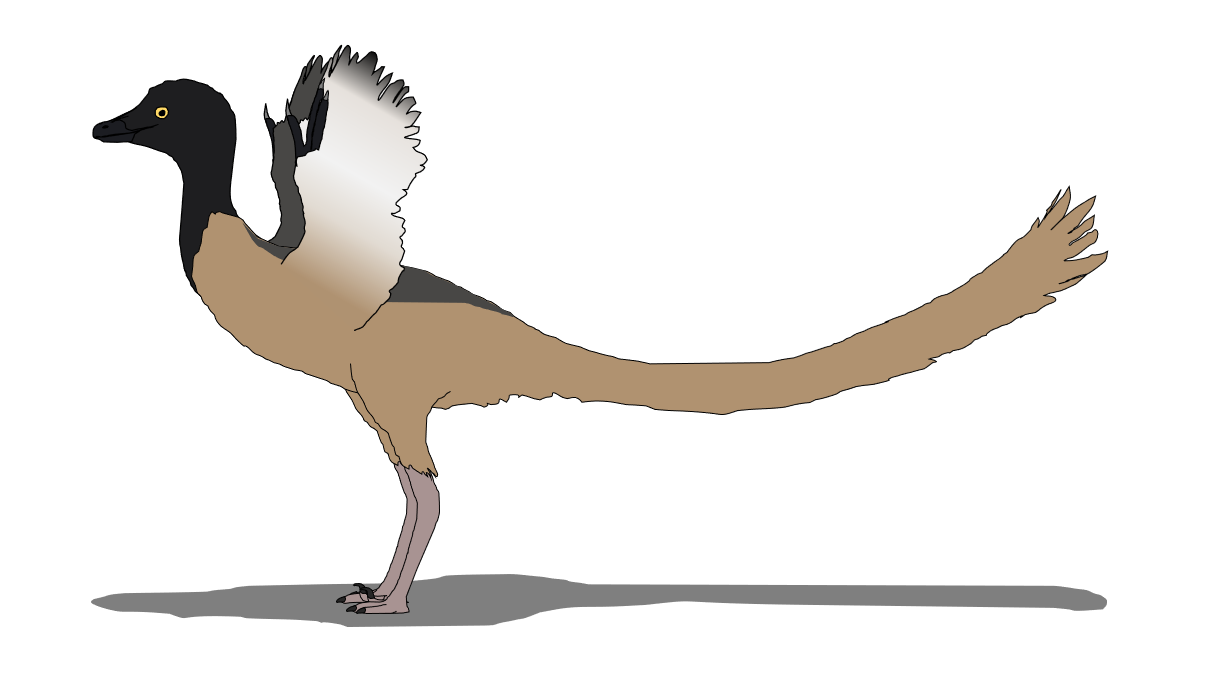
- Life restoration

Scientific classification
- Kingdom: Animalia
- Phylum: Chordata
- Class: Reptilia
- Clade: Dinosauria
- Clade: Saurischia
- Clade: Theropoda
- Clade: Maniraptora
- Clade: Pennaraptora
- Clade: Paraves
- Genus: †Overoraptor

Type species
- † Overoraptor chimentoi Motta et al., 2020

= Overoraptor =

Overoraptor Temporal range: Early Cretaceous (Albian), 106.2 Ma

Extinct genus of theropod dinosaurs

Overoraptor (/ˌʊuvərʊuˈræptər/, meaning "piebald thief") is an extinct genus of paravian theropod of uncertain affinities from the Early Cretaceous Huincul Formation of Argentinian Patagonia. The genus contains a single species, O. chimentoi, known from several bones of the hands, feet, and hips alongside some vertebrae.

== Discovery and naming ==
Overoraptor type locality in Rio Negro Province, Argentina

The fossil specimens of Overoraptor were unearthed by Dr. Roberto Nicolás Chimento in the Violante Farm locality, which is southeast of the Ezequiel Ramos-Mexía lake, in the northwestern portion of Rio Negro Province, Argentina. This outcrop is part of the Huincul Formation, which is dated to the Aptian stage in the Cretaceous period. This formation has yielded some of the largest South American dinosaurs including the massive sauropod Argentinosaurus and the theropod Mapusaurus.

The precise date of the discovery of the type series of Overoraptor is not publicly known, but the specimens were reposited in the collections of the Carlos Ameghino Provincial Museum in Cipolletti, which is near the outcrop of the Huincul Formation where the specimens were discovered. The fossils were described as a new genus and species of paravian theropod in May 2020 by Matías Motta, Federico Agnolín, Federico Brissón Egli, and Fernando Novas in the journal The Science of Nature (or Naturwissenschaften).

The holotype specimen, MACN-Pv 805, was disarticulated when it was found and it is relatively fragmentary. It consists of two phalanges and a metacarpal of the right hand, two hemal arches, the right scapula, the right ulna, a partial ilium, a partial pubis, two metatarsals from each foot, and several phalanges and unguals from the left foot.

The paratype specimen, MPCA-Pv 818, was discovered at the same locality in association with the holotype. It is about 20% smaller than the holotype, which led the researchers describing it to conclude that they were likely not from a fully-grown animal. The paratype consists of two phalanges from the right hand, a fragment of the ilium, the right pubis, one of the right metatarsals, and one pedal phalanx from each foot.

The generic name, Overoraptor, comes from the Spanish word "overo", meaning "piebald"—referencing the coloration of the fossils—and the Latin word "raptor", meaning "thief". The specific epithet, "chimentoi", was given in honor of Roberto Nicolás Chimento, who initially discovered its remains.

== Description ==
In their 2020 description of the genus, Motta and colleagues estimated that Overoraptor would have been about 1.3 metres (4.3 ft) in length, although they do not provide an estimate of the animal's mass. Gregory S. Paul estimated the size of Overoraptor to be about 3 metres (9.8 ft) long and weighing about 30 kilograms (66 lb).

Motta and colleagues diagnosed Overoraptor as being distinct from all other paravians from the following unique autapomorphies: a medial deflection at the distal end of the scapula, a reduced and ridge-like acromial process, an extensive crest on metacarpal I, a crest ending in a distal posterior tubicle on metatarsal II, and a metatarsal III that is taller than it is wide at the midpoint along its length. Motta and colleagues further diagnosed the genus by the co-occurrence of the following autapomorphies: lateral ridges on the caudal centra, a robust ulna, a saddle-shaped radial cotyle on the ulna, a non-hinged joint at the distal end of metatarsal III, and dorsally displaced pits on the second toe. In the description of its osteology, Motta and colleagues considered both the holotype and paratype together, rather than describing each specimen individually.

The scapular anatomy of Overoraptor resembles that of stem-avialans in the presence of a cup-shaped glenoid fossa, but it differs from most other paravians in that the acromial process projects dorsally rather than medially. The overall morphology of the scapula resembles the enigmatic paravian taxon Rahonavis because the scapular blade projects medially outward at its distal-most end. The ratio of the lengths of the ulna to the metacarpals is similar to the ratio found in dromaeosaurs and less than that of more derived avialans. The ulna itself is also curved, which is the plesiomorphic condition in paravians, unlike the straight ulnae of Anchiornis and related taxa. However, the ulna of Overoraptor resembles the derived avialan condition in the presence of a saddle-shaped cotyle on the ulnar-radial articular surface.

The metacarpal bones of Overoraptor were noted by Motta and colleagues to be unusual in shape, namely that it is proportionally much wider and shorter than those known from other non-avialan paravians and there is a distinctly asymmetrical ginglymoidal surface which articulates with the lateral condyle. The manual phalanges are slender and elongate, which is common in the paravian taxa that retain their fingers. Similarly, the manual unguals are mediolaterally compressed, sharp, and curved, similar to the condition seen in dromaeosaurs.

The foot bones of Overoraptor are sub-arctometatarsalian, meaning the middle metatarsal narrows at the medial end but it is not completely pinched together by the other two bones of the ankle. The foot also bears the archetypal raptorial second digit (the characteristic toe claw of dromaeosaurs), which is short in length and proportionally robust relative to other taxa with this claw.

== Classification ==
In order to evaluate the phylogenetic position of Overoraptor within paraves, Motta and colleagues employed the data sets used by Agnolin and Novas (2013), Brusatte and colleagues (2014), Gianechini and colleagues (2017), and Hu and colleagues (2018) and added the scored characters of the new taxon. They also modified these data sets to include data found in more recently published research for some taxa.

Their analyses recovered Overoraptor in a variety of positions including as a basal maniraptoran, a basal pennaraptoran, and a basal paravian, but they found the tree with the highest support values in their analysis recovered Overoraptor as the sister taxon of Rahonavis in a clade that is the sister-taxon of avialae and to which unenlagiidae is basal. The Overoraptor-Rahonavis clade was recovered with the following synapomorphies: a complex set of ridges on the lateral surfaces of the caudal centra and a medial deflection of the distal end of the scapular blade. Even considering the similarities between the two taxa, Motta and colleagues also remark that the recovery of this clade may be the result of the unique mix of plesiomorphic and derived characters present in Overoraptor. The recovery of this clade is also suggested to be an early indicator of a much more diverse community of paravians across Gondwana that have yet to be fully uncovered.

A number of unorthodox results were obtained from the analysis of Motta and colleagues. They recovered microraptorians and unenlagiines as being outside of dromaeosauridae as successive stem clades to avialae. They similarly found troodontids as being the sister group of all other paravians rather than being either the sister group of dromaeosaurs or avialans, which have been the results obtained by other recent analyses. An abbreviated version of the strict consensus tree from their analysis using the data set from Agnolin and Novas (2013) is shown below.

- Paraves
  - Troodontidae
  - - Dromaeosauridae
    - - Microraptoria
      - - Unenlagiidae
        - - - Overoraptor
            - Rahonavis
          - Avialae
            - - Alcmonavis
              - Archaeopterygidae
            - - Anchiornithidae
              - - Jeholornithidae
                - Pygostylia

In 2021, Andrea Cau and Daniel Madzia published their redescription of the troodontid Borogovia, which contained a phylogenetic analysis using a wide variety of coelurosaur taxa. They used several different interpretive frameworks including the coding of Rahonavis as an unenlagiine, Balaur as a velociraptorine, and halszkaraptorines as being basal to the troodontid-dromaeosaurid split as well as an unweighted analysis without these constraints. The poorly-understood taxon Fukuivenator was also coded as a paravian, although recent studies have resolved that it is probably a basal therizinosaur or some other non-paravian maniraptoran. The most strongly-supported result of their analysis was one in which troodontidae was the sister taxon of avialae, which includes Overoraptor, Rahonavis, Balaur, and several other taxa. An abbreviated version of the tree recovered by their parsimony analysis can be seen below.

- Paraves
  - Fukuivenator
  - - Dromaeosauridae
    - - Troodontidae
      - Avialae
        - - Archaeopteryx
          - Anchiornithidae
        - - "Archaeopteryx" albersdoerferi
          - - Alcmonavis
            - Rahonavis
          - Overoraptor
          - - Balaur
            - Jeholornithiformes
            - Pygostylia

== Paleoecology ==
=== Paleoenvironment ===
Huinculsaurus was discovered in the Argentine Province of Neuquén. It was originally reported from the Huincul Group of the Río Limay Formation, which have since become known as the Huincul Formation and the Río Limay Subgroup, the latter of which is a subdivision of the Neuquén Group. This unit is located in the Neuquén Basin in Patagonia. The Huincul Formation is composed of yellowish and greenish sandstones of fine-to-medium grain, some of which are tuffaceous. These deposits were laid down during the Lower Cretaceous. Earlier findings suggested a Cenomanian–Turonian age, or possibly an Early Turonian to Late Santonian age. The deposits represent the drainage system of a braided river.

The Huincul Formation is thought to represent an arid environment with ephemeral or seasonal streams. In some areas, it is up to 250 metres (820 ft) thick. It is mainly composed of green and yellow sandstones and can easily be differentiated from the overlying Lisandro Formation, which is red in color. The Candeleros Formation, underlying the Huincul, is composed of darker sediments, making all three formations easily distinguishable.

Fossilised pollen indicates a wide variety of plants were present in the Huincul Formation. A study of the El Zampal section of the formation found hornworts, liverworts, ferns, conifers, and some angiosperms (flowering plants).

=== Contemporary fauna ===
Size comparison of some of the fauna of the Huincul Formation, with Overoraptor shown in red

The Huincul Formation is among the richest Patagonian vertebrate associations, preserving fish including lungfish and gar, chelid turtles, squamates, sphenodonts, neosuchian crocodilians, and a wide variety of dinosaurs. Vertebrates are most commonly found in the lower, and therefore older, part of the formation.

The Violante Farm locality is one of the most productive in the Huincul Formation, having yielded specimens of a wide variety of non-avian dinosaur species. Among these were the abelisaur Tralkasaurus, the megaraptoran Aoniraptor, the carcharodontosaur Taurovenator, and the enigmatic taxon Gualicho in addition to a variety of remains from indeterminate abelisaurs and coelurosaurs. Specimens of the titanosaur Choconsaurus were also discovered at this locality and represent the largest animal confidently known to have coexisted at this locality.

Many other non-avian dinosaurs are known from the Huincul Formation, although it is not known with confidence if all of them coexisted with Overoraptor. Sauropods are represented by the giant titanosaurs Bustingorrytitan, Chucarosaurus, and Argentinosaurus as well as the rebbachisaurids Cathartesaura, Limaysaurus, and Sidersaura. Theropods are also diverse and include the abelisaurs Ilokelesia and Skorpiovenator, the noasaurid Huinculsaurus, the carcharodontosaurids Mapusaurus and Meraxes.

== See also ==
- 2020 in archosaur paleontology
- Biogeography of paravian dinosaurs
- Origin of avian flight
