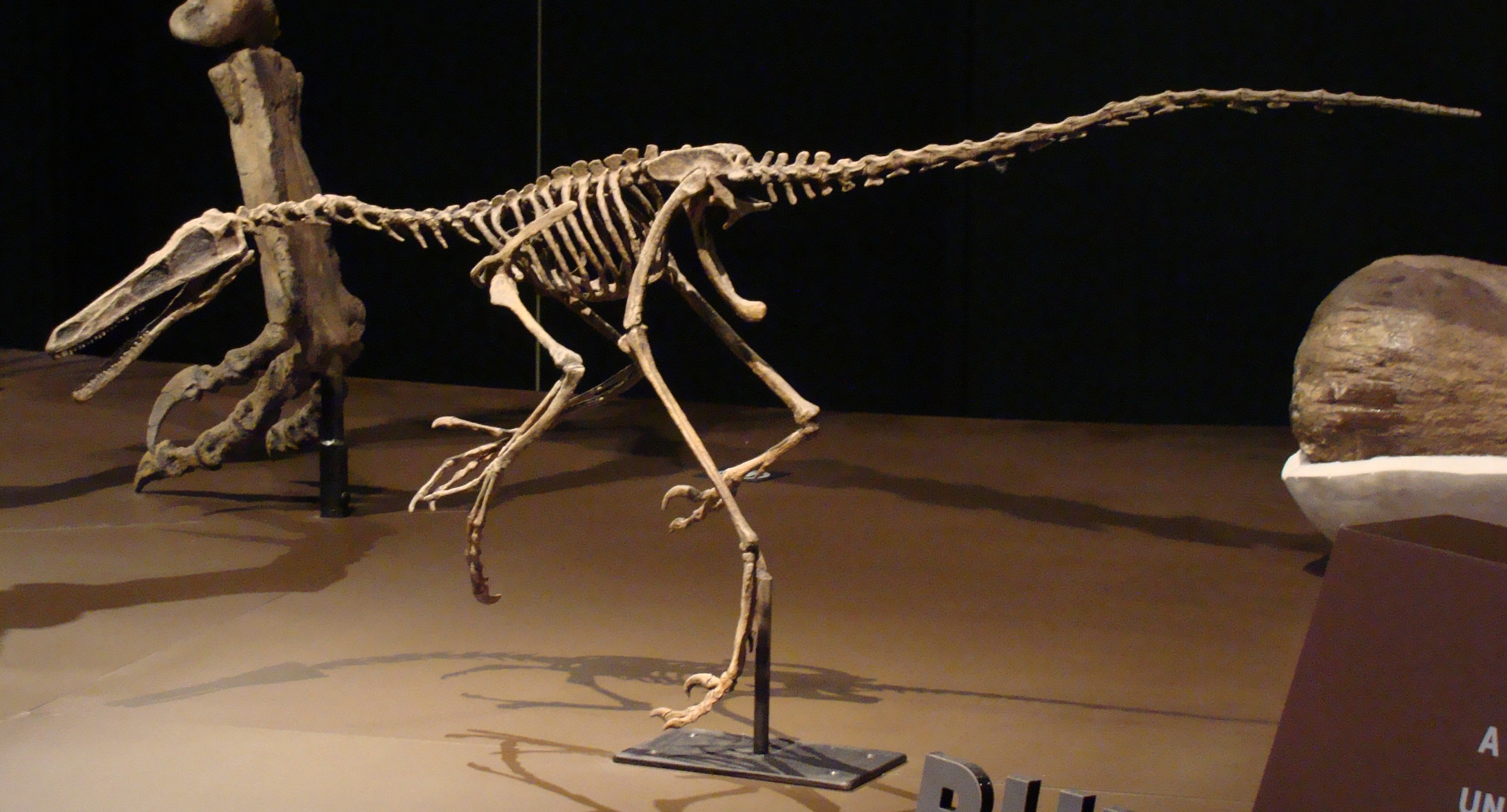
- Mounted skeleton, Royal Ontario Museum, Toronto, Canada

Scientific classification
- Kingdom: Animalia
- Phylum: Chordata
- Class: Reptilia
- Clade: Dinosauria
- Clade: Saurischia
- Clade: Theropoda
- Clade: Paraves
- Subfamily: †Unenlagiinae
- Genus: †Buitreraptor; Makovicky et al. 2005

Type species
- †Buitreraptor gonzalezorum Makovicky et al. 2005

= Buitreraptor =

Buitreraptor Temporal range: Early Cretaceous, ~111–106 Ma

Dromaeosaurid dinosaur genus from the Late Cretaceous

Buitreraptor (meaning "La Buitrera seizer") is a genus of unenlagiine theropod dinosaurs that lived during the Early Cretaceous (Albian stage) of Argentina at the Candeleros Formation. Buitreraptor was described in 2005 and the type species is Buitreraptor gonzalezorum. It was rooster-sized and had a very elongated head with many small teeth.

== History of discovery ==
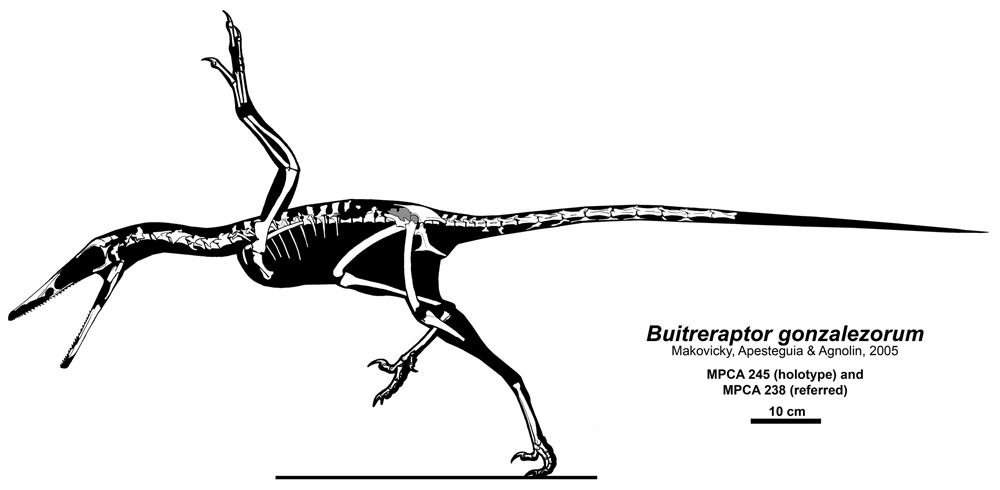
Skeletal composite of specimens MPCA 245 and MPCA 238

Four specimens of Buitreraptor were found in 2004 in sandstone in Patagonia, Argentina during an excavation led by Sebastián Apesteguia, researcher of CONICET at the Fundacion Felix de Azara - Maimonides University, and Peter Makovicky, curator of dinosaurs at the Field Museum in Chicago. Buitreraptor is known from the Mid-Cretaceous Candeleros Formation, when South America was an isolated continent like Australia today. It was uncovered in a famous fossil site named La Buitrera, the "vulture roost". Although dinosaurs are rare in this site, another nearby site had earlier yielded the giant Giganotosaurus, one of the largest known carnivorous dinosaurs.

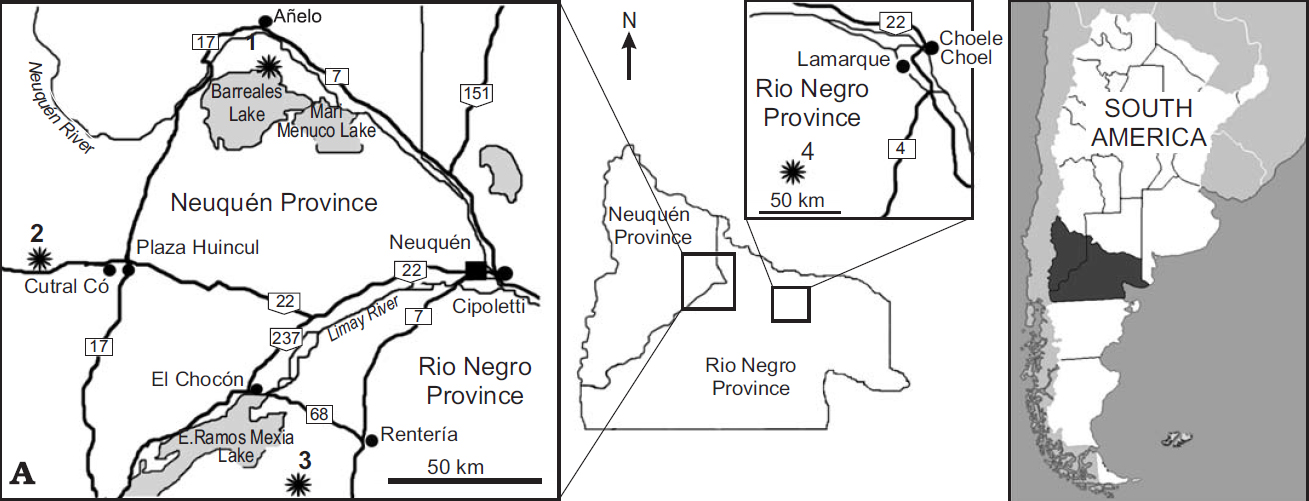
Geographic provenance of South American unenlagiines

Buitreraptor gonzalezorum is the only known species of the genus Buitreraptor. It was named by Peter Makovicky, Sebastián Apesteguía and Federico Agnolín. The genus name means "vulture raider", from the Spanish word buitre meaning vulture, in reference to La Buitrera, and Latin raptor, "seizer". The specific name honours the González brothers, Fábian and Jorge, who realised much of the actual excavation and preparation of the fossils. The holotype specimen, MPCA 245, consists of a partial skeleton with skull of an adult individual. The paratype is MPCA 238, a sacrum with a right pelvis and right hindlimb. The skull of the holotype was described in detail in 2017, while 2018 saw a slew of new papers on the anatomy of the genus. These include descriptions of new specimens, a study on the tail anatomy of the genus, and a general overview of the postcrania of multiple specimens.

== Description ==
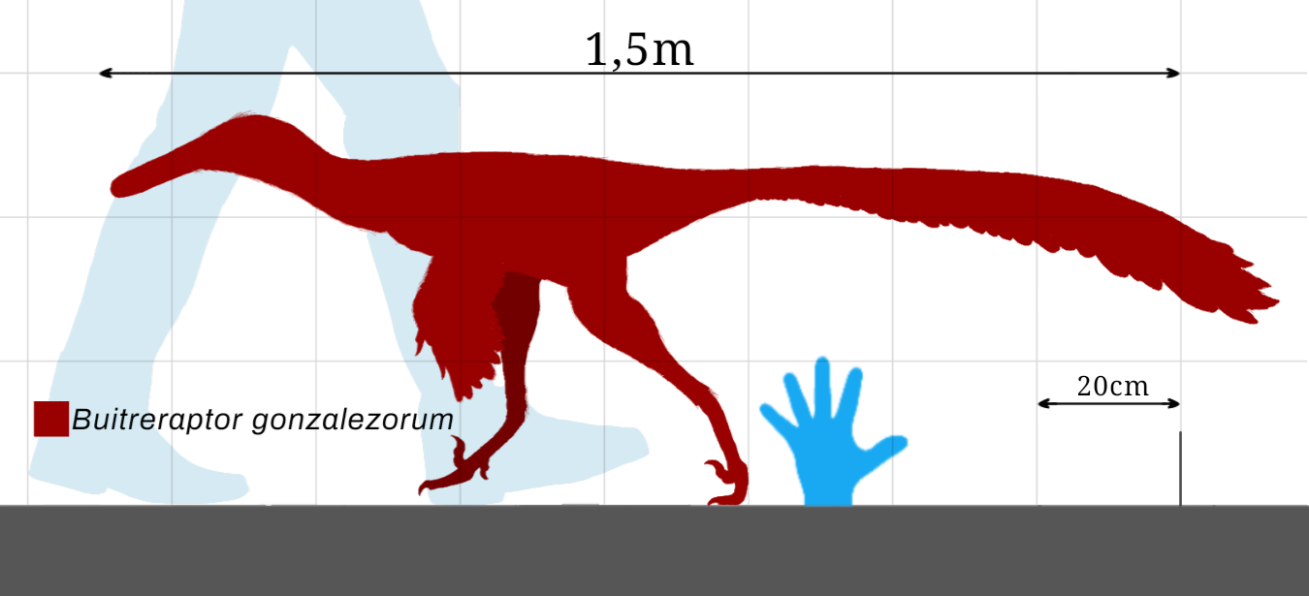
Size compared to a human

Buitreraptor was a rather small dinosaur. In 2010, Gregory S. Paul estimated the length at 1.5 metres, the weight at three kilograms. Buitreraptor has some different physical features than typical northern dromaeosaurs, such as Velociraptor. Buitreraptor has a slender, flat, extremely elongated snout with many small teeth that lack meat-tearing serrations or cutting edges and are grooved, strongly recurved and flattened. From this, the scientists who initially described it concluded that this dinosaur was not a hunter of relatively large animals like some other dromaeosaurs, but rather a hunter of small animals such as lizards and mammals. The forelimbs of Buitreraptor were long and ended in very long and thin three-fingered hands. All known parts of the hand of Buitreraptor are proportionally longer than in the dromaeosaurids Deinonychus and Velociraptor, except for the ungual bones which are proportionally smaller in Buitreraptor.

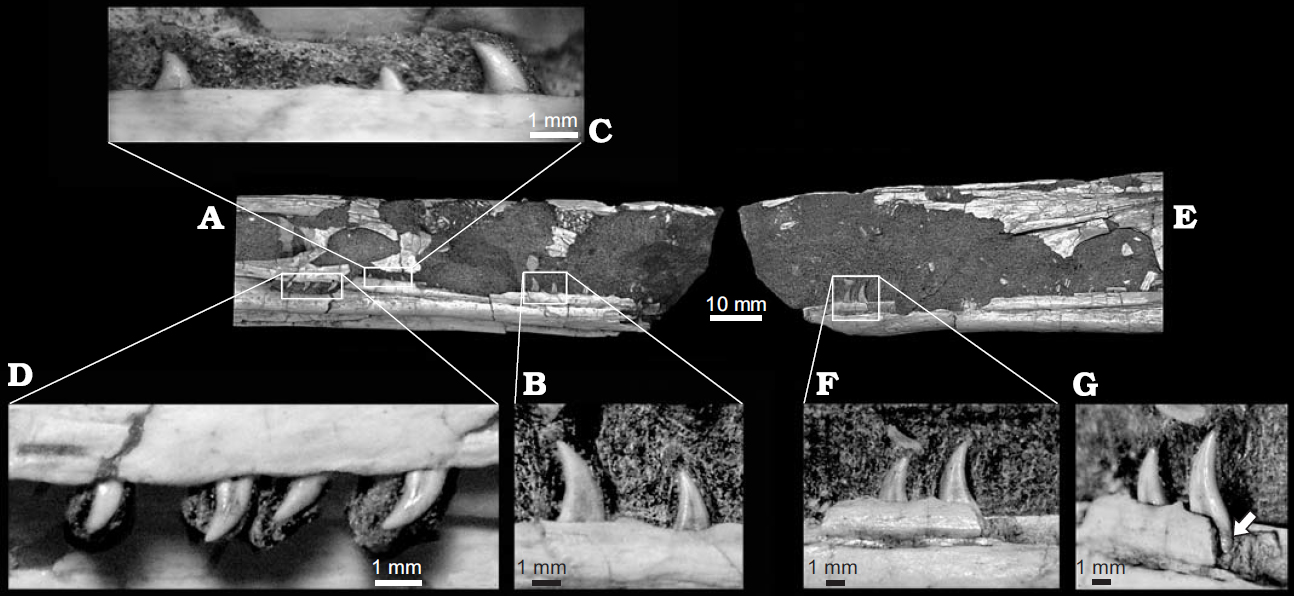
Teeth in the jaws

The body as a whole was also elongated, with a shallow ribcage. The enlarged sickle claw at the second toe of the foot formed a blade that was long although less large than in dromaeosaurids such as Velociraptor and Deinonychus. No fossil discoveries have been made of any feathers of Buitreraptor. However, there are relatives like Microraptor and Sinornithosaurus, of which fossils with preserved feathers are known. Since its close relatives had feathers, it is likely that Buitreraptor also was feathered. According to Apesteguia, this is comparable to reconstructing an extinct monkey with fur because all modern monkeys have fur.

== Classification ==
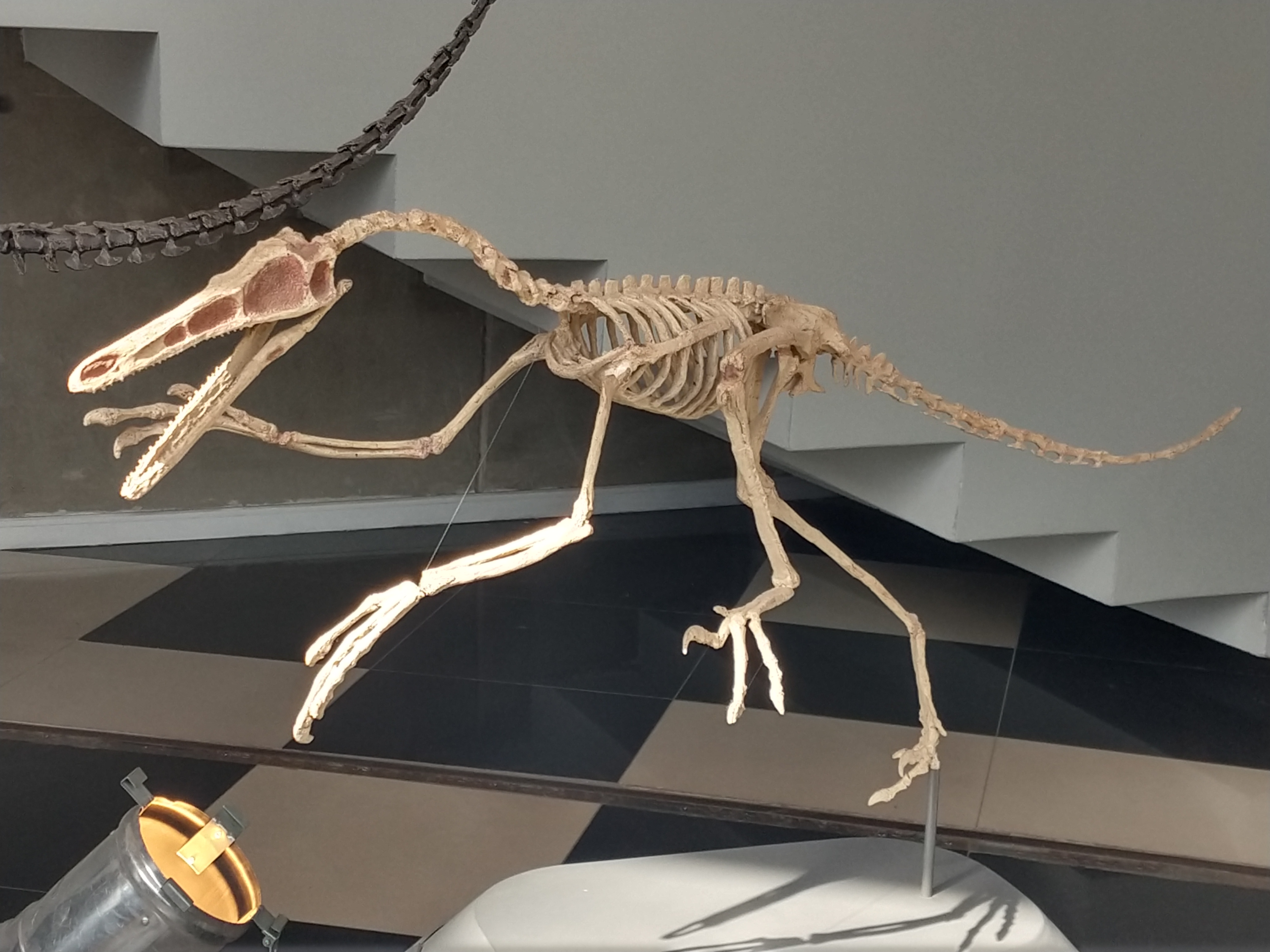
Reconstructed skeleton

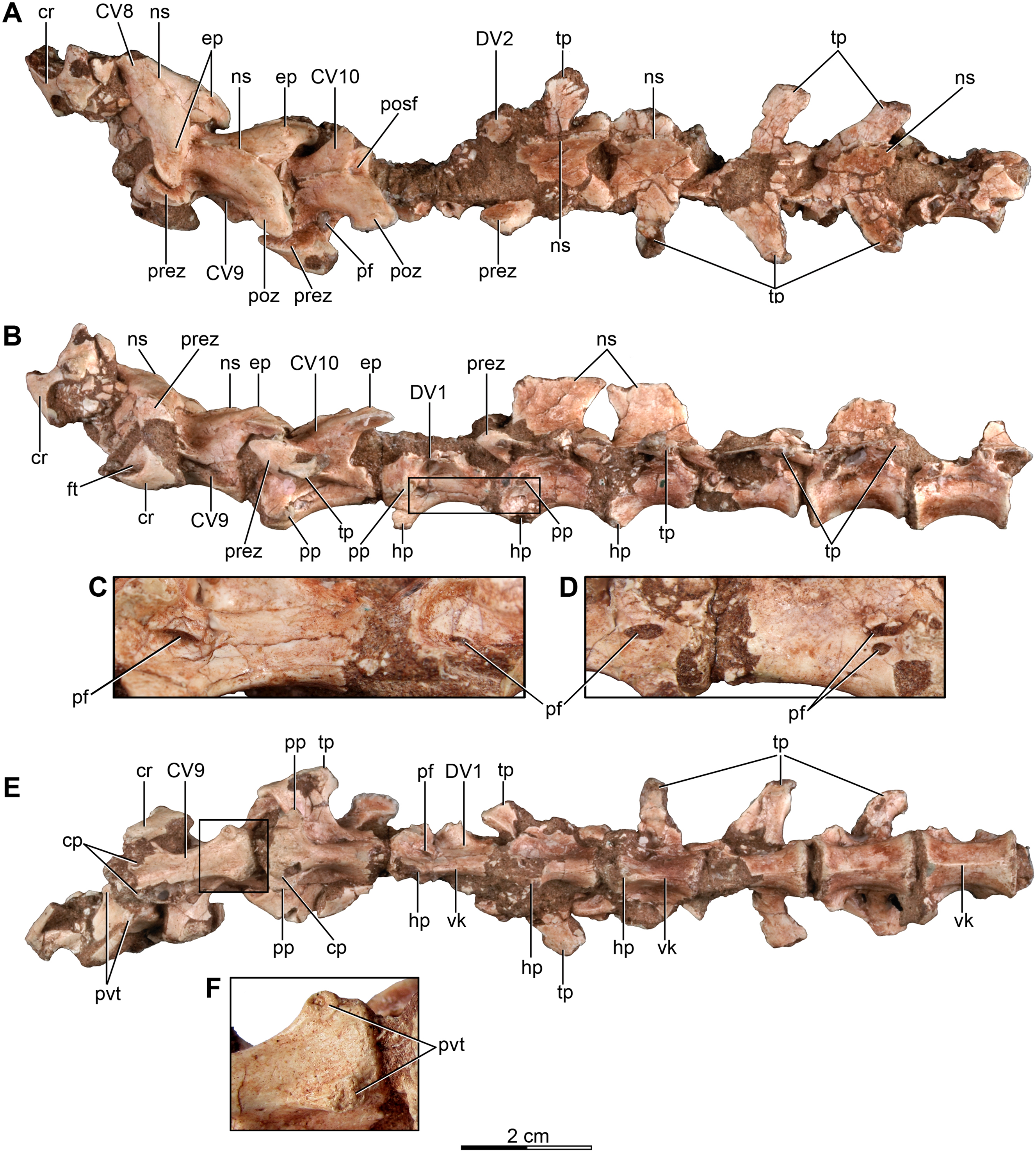
Tail and back vertebrae

Buitreraptor shows a mosaic of dromaeosaurid, troodontid and avialan traits. It was in 2005 assigned to the Dromaeosauridae. A cladistic analysis by the describers showed it was part of the dromaeosaurid Unenlagiinae. The discovery of Buitreraptor has also been the subject of discussion among scientists as to the question whether flight could have evolved independently in birds and dromaeosaurids or was derived from some flying common ancestor. Some scientists propose that Rahonavis, a relative to Buitreraptor, could fly. However, evidence for flight has not been unequivocally found in other dromaeosaurids, which has led some scientists to propose that dromaeosaurids evolved flight independently of birds if Rahonavis could indeed fly.

The following cladogram is based on the phylogenetic analysis conducted by Hartman and colleagues in 2019, showing the relationships of Buitreraptor among the other genera assigned to the family "Unenlagiidae":

- Unenlagiidae
  - Austroraptor
  - - Buitreraptor
    - - - - Pyroraptor
          - Pamparaptor
        - - - - Rahonavis
              - Ornithodesmus
            - - Dakotaraptor
              - Unenlagia

=== Evolution ===
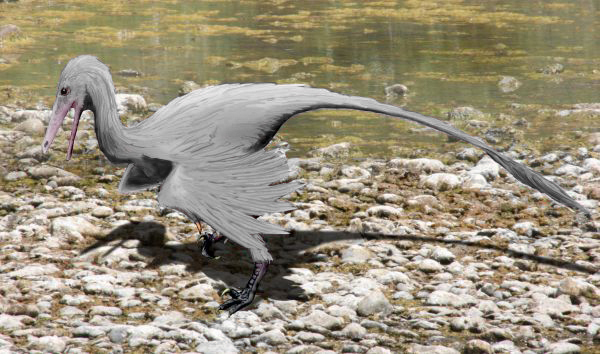
Life restoration

Other than Buitreraptor, the only other known dromaeosaurs from the southern continents are Neuquenraptor, Austroraptor, and Unenlagia from South America (discovered earlier in 2005), Rahonavis (once thought to be a true avian bird) from Madagascar, and unidentified dromaeosaur-like teeth from Australia. This discovery in the Southern Hemisphere helped scientists to clarify that the dromaeosaur family was more widely dispersed around the world than previously thought. Evidence indicates that dromaeosaurs first appeared during the Jurassic Period, when all the continents were much closer together than they are today. With the discovery of Buitreraptor, the scientists proposed that dromaeosaurids originated somewhere around 180 million years ago, before Pangaea broke up. However, other paleontologists have in later studies placed the time of origin for Dromaeosauridae to about 160 million years ago.

The scientists see it as an alternative possibility that dromaeosaurids originated on the ancient continent Laurasia in the north and during the Cretaceous Period migrated to southern Gondwana, since the species known from the Southern Hemisphere bear distinctive characteristics not shared by their northern relatives. La Buitrera also yielded remains of terrestrial crocodiles, pterosaurs, the largest known rhynchocephalians, limbed snakes, iguanian lizards, chelid turtles, mammals, and dipnoan fishes

== Paleobiology ==
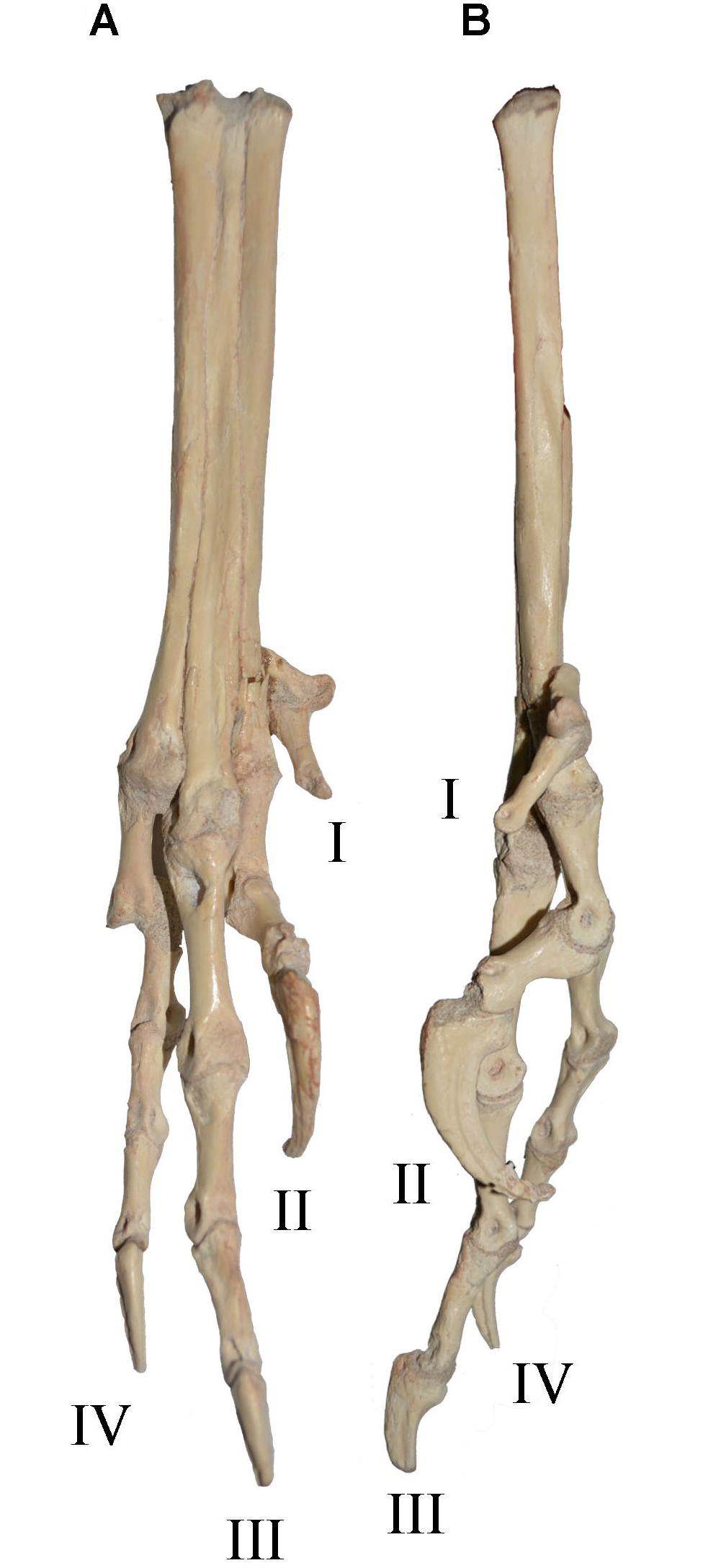
Foot bones

Unenlagiines had better capacities for running and pursuit predation than other dromaeosaurids such as Laurasian dromaeosaurids (Eudromaeosauria), which were more stocky and had shorter legs and had an active predatory lifestyle. Unenlagiines were highly cursorial animals because they were more gracile and had modified metatarsals that are relatively thin and lengthened. Based on these adaptations, it is likely that unenlagiines preyed on small, fast animals, although the exact animals are unknown. Buitreraptor features particular traits that can be attributed to specific hunting methods. Models for Buitreraptor propose that it hunted by traveling large distances in pursuit of prey, which may explain the long-legged trait shared by various genera of Unenlagiidae. Buitreraptor is characterized by its long forelimbs and hands; it likely relied on them to restrain prey and the curved claw of the second pedal digit would have injured or killed the victim. Buitreraptor probably swallowed its prey whole due to its lack of serrated teeth with flesh-tearing capabilities; the teeth functioned to simply hold prey.

Buitreraptor might have been capable of powered flight, as discussed in a 2025 study.

== See also ==
- Timeline of dromaeosaurid research
