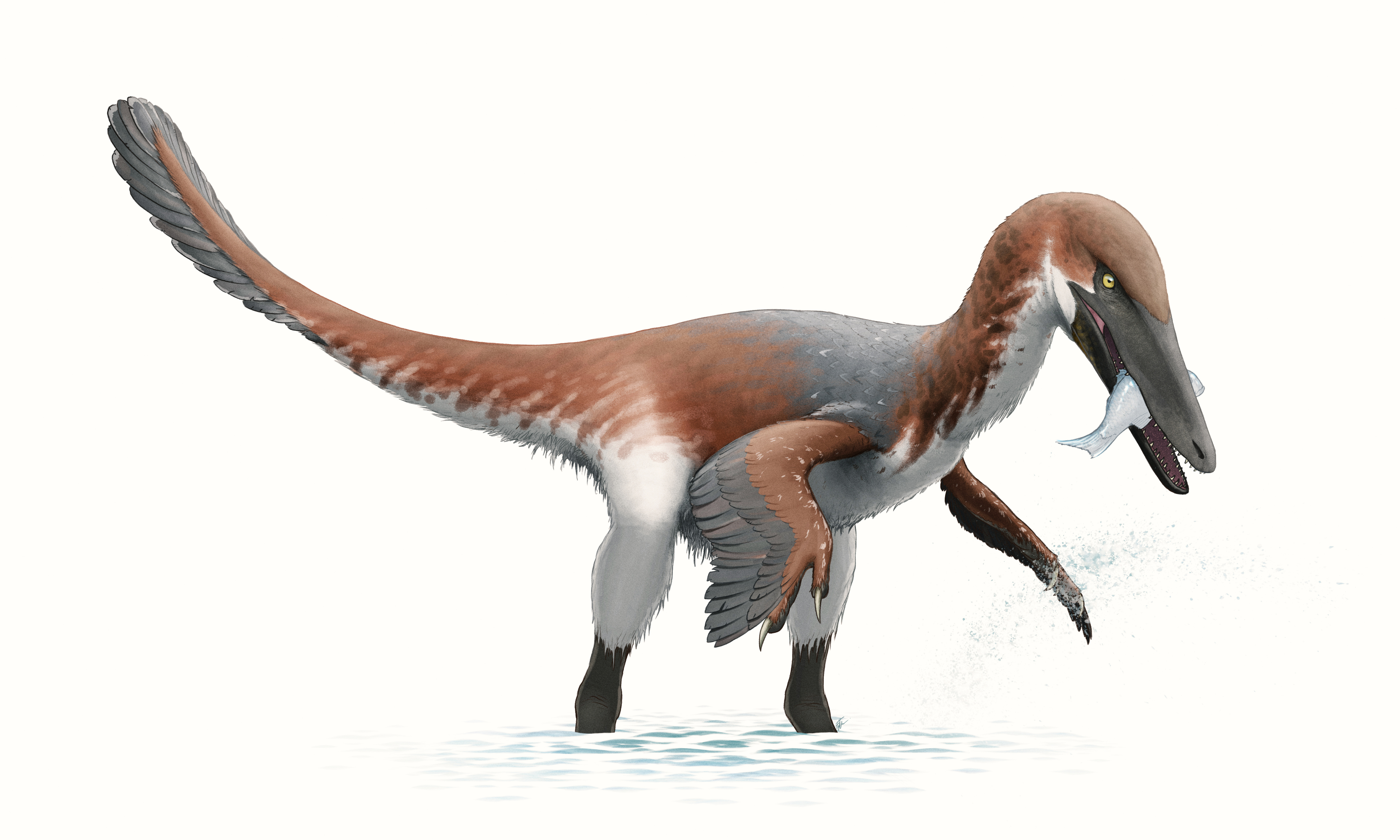
- Life reconstruction of Austroraptor cabazai

Scientific classification
- Kingdom: Animalia
- Phylum: Chordata
- Class: Reptilia
- Clade: Dinosauria
- Clade: Saurischia
- Clade: Theropoda
- Clade: Paraves
- Family: †Unenlagiidae; Bonaparte, 1999

Type species
- †Unenlagia comahuensis Novas & Puerta, 1997

Subfamilies
- †Halszkaraptorinae?; †Unenlagiinae

Synonyms
- Unenlagiinia? Brum et al., 2021

= Unenlagiidae =

Unenlagiids Temporal range: Albian–Maastrichtian

Extinct family of dinosaurs

Unenlagiidae is a proposed family of eumaniraptoran paravians that includes the subfamilies Unenlagiinae and possibly Halszkaraptorinae. Fossils of both subfamilies have been found in both Gondwanan and Laurasian deposits. The biology of the group suggests that some members were semiaquatic specialists.

== Classification ==
The family Unenlagiidae traditionally includes the same members as the previously named subfamily of Dromaeosauridae, Unenlagiinae, so Unenlagiidae was often seen as a synonym of Dromaeosauridae. However, since the 2010s, there have been subsequent studies that have questioned this placement, necessitating the revival of the family name. Some have placed unenlagiids as outside Dromaeosauridae, being the sister taxon or closely related to Avialae, while others have placed the newly recognized halszkaraptorines in the family, as basal deinonychosaurs outside Dromaeosauridae and Troodontidae. Other recent studies supported the traditional placement of Halszkaraptorinae and Unenlagiinae in Dromaeosauridae, forming no distinct clade. In 2021, Brum et al. named the clade Unenlagiinia for a unified Unenlagia+Halszkaraptor clade, recovering them as basal dromaeosaurs.

The following cladogram is from Motta et al., 2020, showing Unenlagiidae outside dromaeosaurids and more closely related to Avialae:

- Paraves
  - Troodontidae
  - Eumaniraptora
    - Dromaeosauridae
    - - Microraptoria
      - - Unenlagiidae
          - Austroraptor
          - Buitreraptor
          - Unenlagia
        - - - Overoraptor
            - Rahonavis
          - Avialae
            - Archaeopterygidae
              - Alcmonavis
              - - Wellnhoferia
                - Archaeopteryx
            - - Anchiornithidae
                - Xiaotingia
                - Anchiornis
              - - Jeholornis
                - Pygostylia

In 2025, Motta et al. recovered Unenlagiidae (along with Halszkaraptoridae, Anchiornithidae, and Archaeopteryx) as within Avialae. The two trees recovered are reproduced below:

Consensus Improved (equal weighting)

- Pennaraptora
  - - Scansoriopterygidae
    - Oviraptorosauria
  - Paraves
    - Troodontidae
    - Eumaniraptora
      - Dromaeosauridae
        - Microraptoria
        - Eudromaeosauridae
      - Avialae
        - Unenlagiinia
          - Halszkaraptoridae
          - Unenlagiidae
        - - - Anchiornithidae
            - Archaeopteryx
          - - Jeholornis
            - Pygostylia

Consensus Improved (implied weighting)

- Pennaraptora
  - - Scansoriopterygidae
    - Oviraptorosauria
  - Paraves
    - Troodontidae
    - Eumaniraptora
      - Dromaeosauridae
        - Microraptoria
        - Eudromaeosauridae
      - Avialae
        - Unenlagiinia
          - Halszkaraptoridae
          - Unenlagiidae
        - - Anchiornithidae
          - - - Fujianvenator
              - Archaeopteryx
            - - Jeholornis
              - Pygostylia
