= Ungual =

Modified toe bone

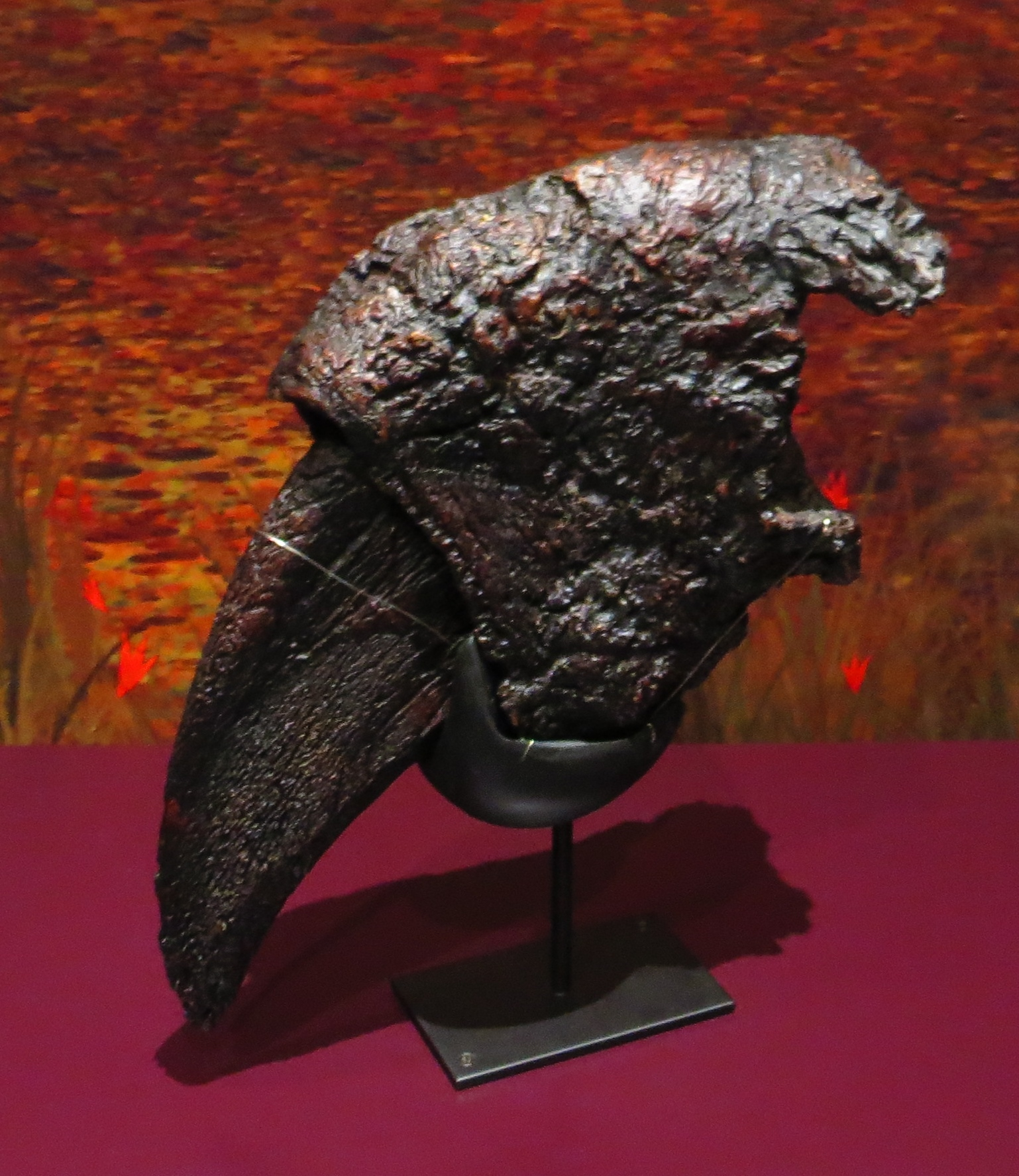
An ungual of the ground sloth Eremotherium

An ungual (from Latin unguis, i.e. nail) is a highly modified distal toe bone which ends in a hoof, claw, or nail. Elephants and ungulates have ungual phalanges, as did the sauropods and horned dinosaurs. A claw is a highly modified ungual phalanx.

As an adjective, ungual means related to nail, as in periungual (around the nail).
