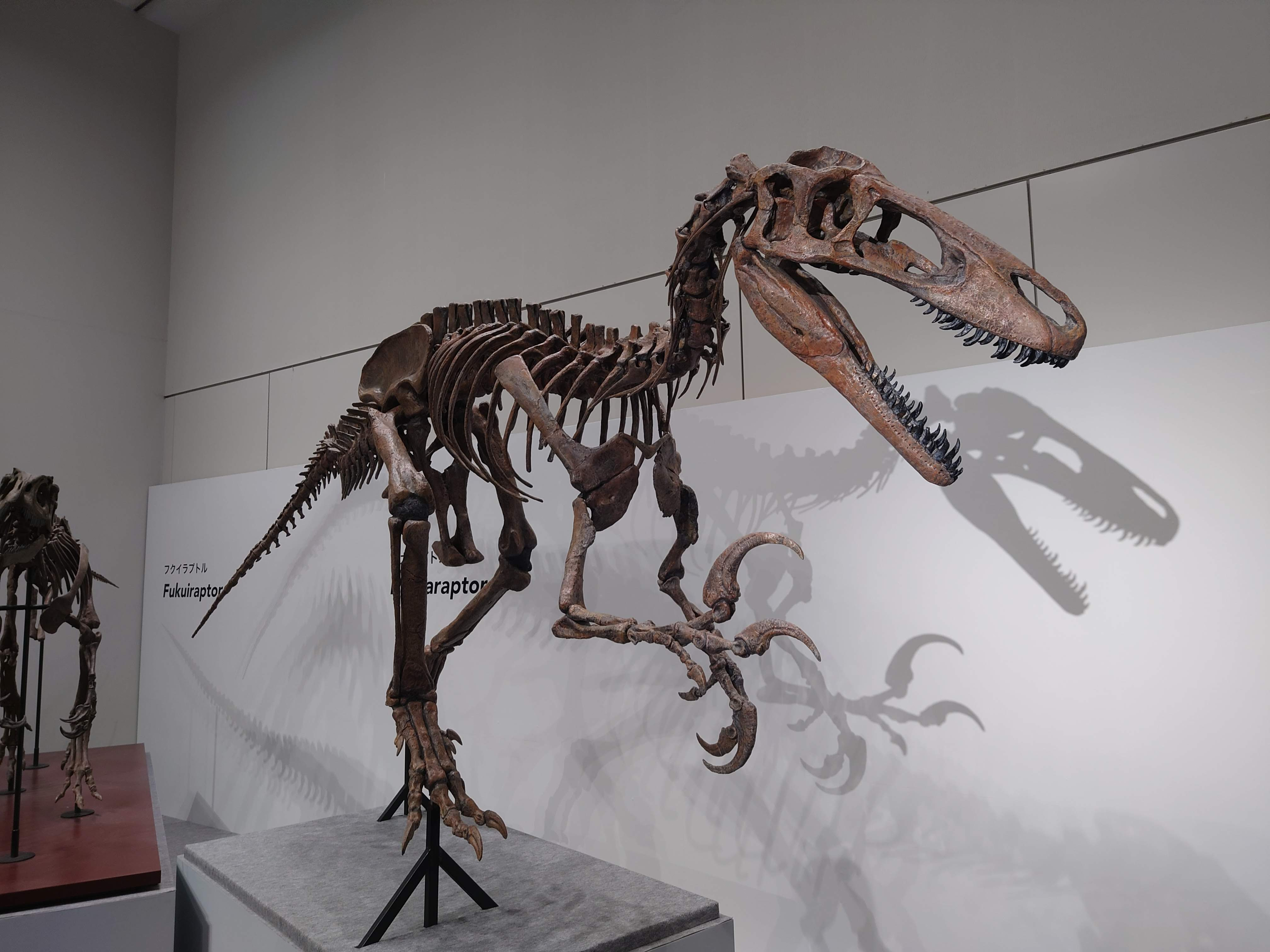
- Reconstructed skeleton in Japan

Scientific classification
- Kingdom: Animalia
- Phylum: Chordata
- Class: Reptilia
- Clade: Dinosauria
- Clade: Saurischia
- Clade: Theropoda
- Clade: †Megaraptora
- Family: †Megaraptoridae
- Genus: †Megaraptor; Novas, 1998
- Species: †M. namunhuaiquii

Binomial name
- †Megaraptor namunhuaiquii Novas, 1998

= Megaraptor =

Megaraptor Temporal range: Late Cretaceous (Turonian – Coniacian) 90–88 Ma

Extinct genus of dinosaurs

Megaraptor (lit. 'large thief') is a genus of large theropod dinosaur, the type genus and namesake of the clade Megaraptora and family Megaraptoridae. Its fossils have been discovered in the Patagonian Portezuelo Formation of Argentina, South America, dating to the Turonian and Coniacian ages of the Late Cretaceous, roughly 90–88 million years ago. One species of Megaraptor, M. namunhuaiquii, has thus been named, known from seven partial or fragmentary skeletons, with only two including skull elements.

The type specimen of Megaraptor consists of a fragmentary assemblage of limb bones, discovered in 1996 by Argentine palaeontologist Fernando E. Novas. Believing that a large claw found at the site came from the animal's foot, he determined that it was probably a coelurosaur related to dromaeosaurs and troodontids, and named it accordingly in 1998. While Novas never stated that Megaraptor belonged to either family, contemporary depictions often portrayed it as a giant dromaeosaurid. The discovery of another specimen revealed that Megaraptor's large claw actually came from its hand, and it was surmised in 2004 to belong to a novel lineage predating the carnosaur–coelurosaur split. Subsequent analyses recovered Megaraptor and related genera (collectively known as megaraptorans) as relatives of the allosauroid Neovenator, However, since the description of a relatively complete juvenile skull in 2014, Megaraptor has primarily been recovered within Coelurosauria, and may have been a close relative, or member of, Tyrannosauroidea.

No complete skeletons of Megaraptor are known, so its anatomy has been pieced together over the years through only a few fragmentary specimens. It has been estimated that Megaraptor measured 8 m (26 ft) in length, and weighed around 1 t (2,200 lb). Its skull, the anatomy of which is known primarily from a juvenile specimen, was long, low, and slender, though in adults it was likely deeper and more robust, with smaller eye sockets and more robust frontal bones. Similar to tyrannosaurs, it had small, conical teeth at the front of its jaws, and longer, more curved teeth near the back, a condition known as heterodonty. Megaraptor had very large deltopectoral crests on its upper arm bones, and various other muscle attachment sites suggest that its arms were strong. The hand claws of Megaraptor were very long and strongly curved, with the claw of the first finger measuring 35 cm (14 in) in total length; the claw of the third finger was the smallest, only 6.5 cm (2.6 in) in length. Similar to dromaeosaurids and birds of prey, these claws may have been lengthened considerably by a sheath of keratin.

The depositional environment of the Portezuelo Formation was a fluvial (river) deposit, with a humid climate. Megaraptor would have shared its ecosystem with various other non-avian archosaurs, including the abelisaurid Elemgasem, the titanosaurian sauropod Futalogknosaurus, the unenlagiine theropod Unenlagia, and the azhdarchoid pterosaur Argentinadraco. It was initially suggested that Megaraptor may have used its hand claws to open carcasses, though a role in active predation is now generally favoured. Due to the relatively gracile construction of its skull compared to that of other theropods, Megaraptor, along with other megaraptorans such as Australovenator, may have relied on its large hand claws to grab prey items, pulling them towards its chest so that they could be dispatched by its jaws.

== History of discovery ==
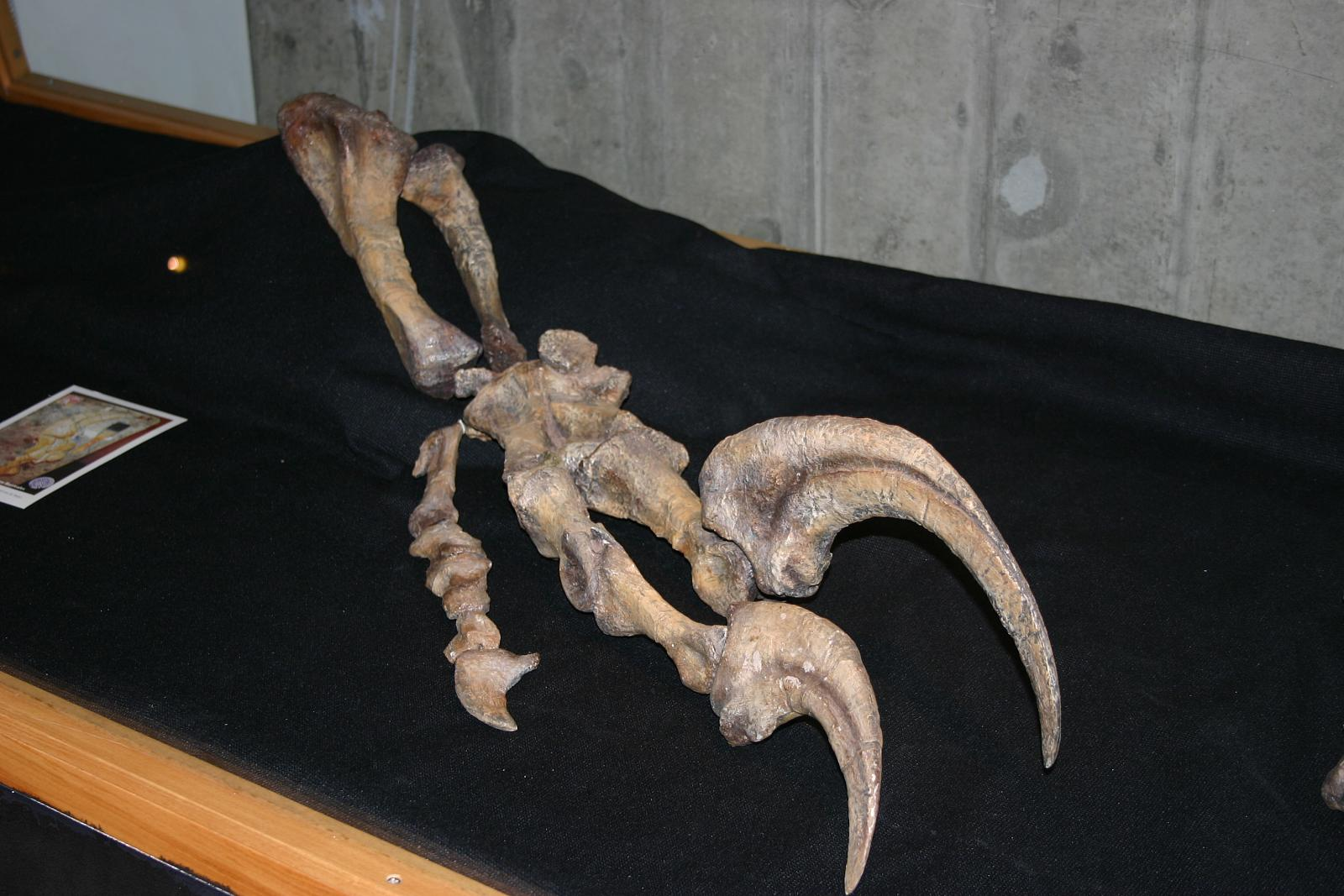
Reconstructed forelimb

In January 1996, Argentine palaeontologist Fernando E. Novas recovered the fragmentary remains of a large theropod, consisting of a right ulna, a left manual phalanx (finger bone), part of a right metatarsal, and a very large ungual phalanx (a bone which supported a claw in life). The specimen was discovered in strata belonging to the Portezuelo Formation, part of the Río Neuquén Subgroup in Neuquén, northwestern Patagonia. The specimen, catalogued as MCF-PVPH 79, was transported to the Museo Carmen Funes, a palaeontological collection in Plaza Huincul. In December 1997, Novas presented a cast of the ungual, which he believed came from the second digit of the foot, to the Houston Museum of Natural Science. The next year, he described it in a paper published in the Journal of Vertebrate Paleontology. Believing that the new taxon was related in some capacity to dromaeosaurids and troodontids, (though noting that a more basal position was possible), Novas gave it the binomial name Megaraptor namunhuaiquii. The genus name derives from the Greek mega (large) and the Latin raptor (thief), while the species name derives from the Mapuche namun (foot) and huaiqui (lance). Though Novas never expressed a belief that M. namunhuaiquii was a dromaeosaurid, it was nevertheless depicted as such in contemporary palaeoart.

In 2004, a second Megaraptor specimen (MUCPv 341), was described in a paper helmed by Jorge O. Calvo. Consisting of a right ulna, radius and a complete manus (hand), found in association with the femur of the sauropod Futalogknosaurus, it demonstrated that the large ungual belonged to the first digit of the manus, as opposed to the second digit of the foot, and led its describers to suggest a position predating the coelurosaur–allosauroid split. In 2005, a third M. namunhuaiquii specimen (MUCPv 595), consisting of the partial skeleton of a juvenile with uncertain affinities, was discovered. It was described in 2014 by a team led by Juan D. Porfiri. The assignment of this specimen to M. namunhuaiquii has since been called into question, including by Porfiri himself. A paper published in 2025 by Maximilian Kellermann and colleagues noted morphological inconsistencies between the juvenile and other, larger specimens referred to M. namunhuaiquii, and the presence of a structure on its caudal (tail) vertebrae which is also present in Maip and Murusraptor. Referral to a single genus, according to them, appeared to be driven largely by the fact that both specimens were found at the same locality. On the other hand, the differences observed may be the result of ontogenetic changes, the anatomical changes an animal undergoes as it matures. A fourth specimen (MUCPv 278), consisting of a humerus, was described in 2025. A fifth specimen assigned to M. namunhuaiquii (MUCPv 1353) is known, discovered in 2008. Consisting of assorted skull material and "a large part" of the postcranial skeleton, it has been described only in a thesis authored by Porfiri. That same thesis references two additional specimens, MUCPv 412 and MUCPv 413, which consist of parts of the ulna and a manual phalanx (finger bone).

== Description ==
=== Size ===
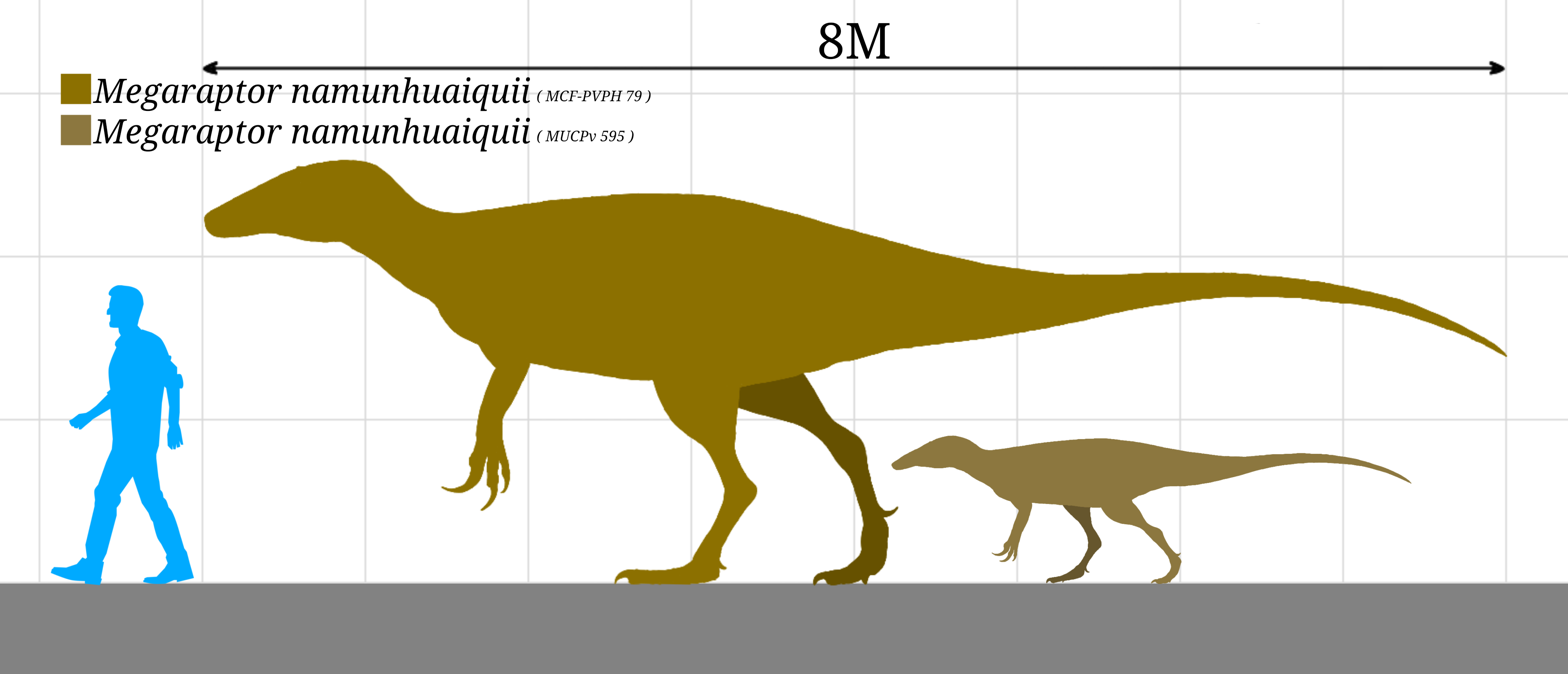
Size of two specimens compared to a human

South American megaraptorids were generally very large, exceeding 7 m (23 ft) in length and 1 t (1,000 kg) in mass. The holotype of Megaraptor was estimated by Fernando Novas to measure around 8 m (26 ft) in length. In 2010, Gregory S. Paul estimated its length at 8 m (26 ft), its weight at 1 t (2,200 lb). Porfiri and colleagues, in their 2014 paper describing MUCPv 595, estimated the length of a mature specimen at 9–10 m (30–33 ft) based on the proportions of Allosaurus. In 2016, extrapolating instead from other megaraptorans, Asier Larramendi and Rubén Molina-Pérez estimated that M. namunhuaiquii had a body length of 8.3 m (27 ft), a hip height of 2.35 m (7.7 ft), and a body mass of 1.3 t (2,900 lb). MUCPv 595 has an estimated body length of 3 m (9.8 ft). While MUCPv 278 is known only from a humerus, that humerus, is roughly twice the size of the equivalent bone in the juvenile specimen, and one-third larger than that of Australovenator.

=== Skull, lower jaw, and dentition ===
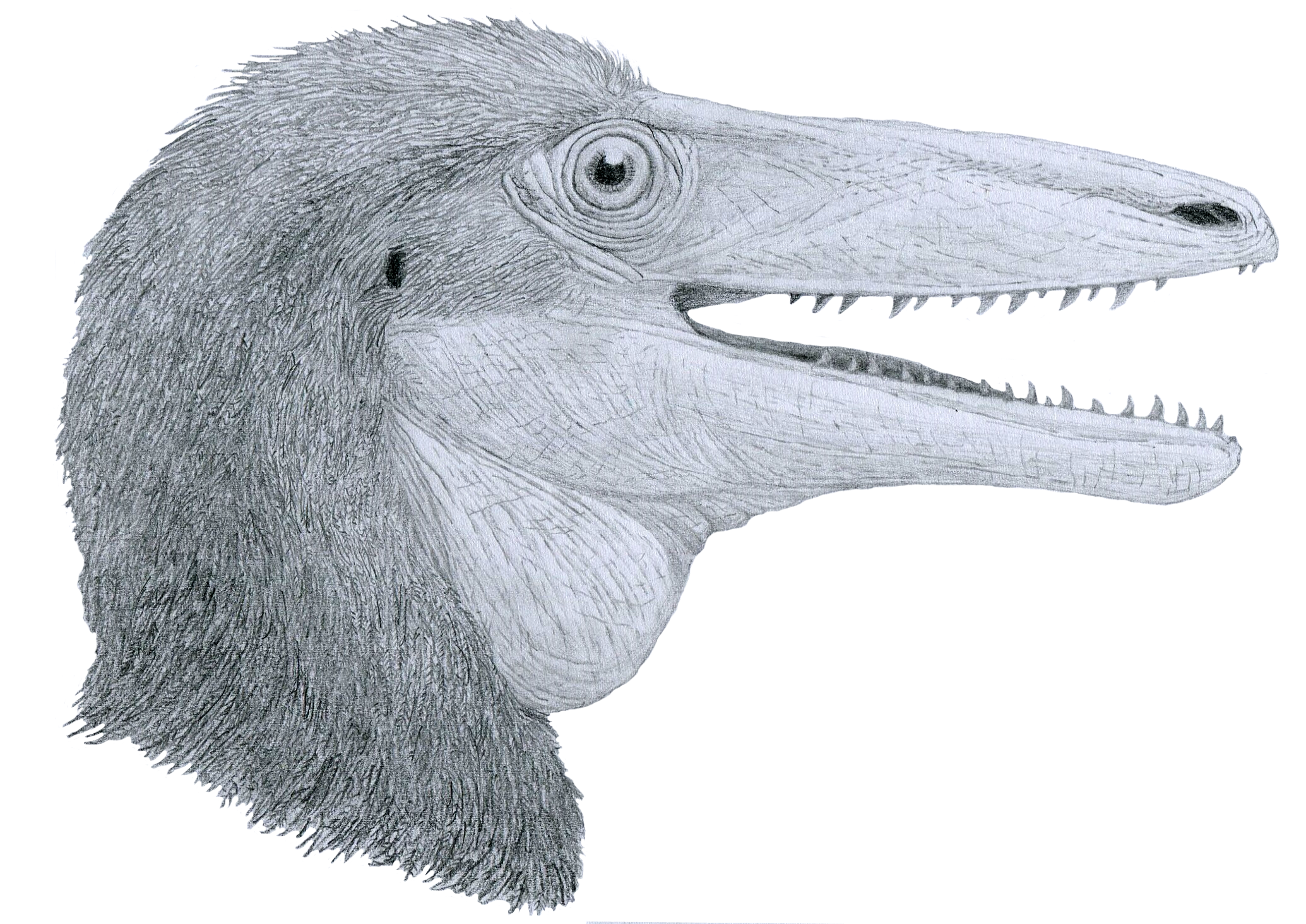
Megaraptor head reconstruction based on the juvenile skull

The skull of Megaraptor is known primarily from a single juvenile specimen, MUCPv 595, which preserves both premaxillae and maxillae, nasals, a left frontal, and a partial braincase, though some elements are known from MUCPv 1353. The skull was fairly gracile and weak compared to that of other theropods, possibly a consequence of the development of more powerful and mobile forelimbs and thus a decreased reliance on the skull for predation. The premaxilla is fairly small and bears several large foramina, as in many tyrannosauroids. The maxilla is long and subtriangular, and has a combination of coelurosaur traits, such as the lengthening of the anterior (front) maxillary ramus, and allosauroid traits, such as the straightness of the dorsal (upper) margin. At the same time, there are traits that match neither group, such as the overall morphology of the maxillary ramus. The nasals were paired and unfused, though this may be attributed to the juvenile nature of the known skull. Similarly, the nasal rugosities present in many other basal tetanurans are absent, though this may again be due to the specimen's age upon death. The frontal is quadrangular, with a wide supratemporal fossa, bound by a strong ridge which contacted that of the opposite frontal, very similar to the condition seen in tyrannosauroids and unlike that of allosauroids. The braincase, too, has a mosaic of coelurosaur (particularly tyrannosauroid) and allosauroid traits. This resembles the pattern seen in tyrannosauroids. Allesio Ciaffi and colleagues, in 2025, used allometry to determine that the skull of a fully mature M. namunhuaiquii would likely have been deeper and more robust than that of MUCPv 595, and that the orbits (eye sockets) would have proportionally been smaller. They did, however, note the caveat that much of M. namunhuaiquii's postcranial skeleton (the elements posterior to the skull, or behind it) contradicts what might be assumed based on allometry alone, and that the same may apply to cranial elements. Based on allometric trends in Murusraptor and tyrannosaurids, it is possible that the frontal bones of megaraptorids such as M. namunhuaiquii would have become wider, deeper, and shorter with age.

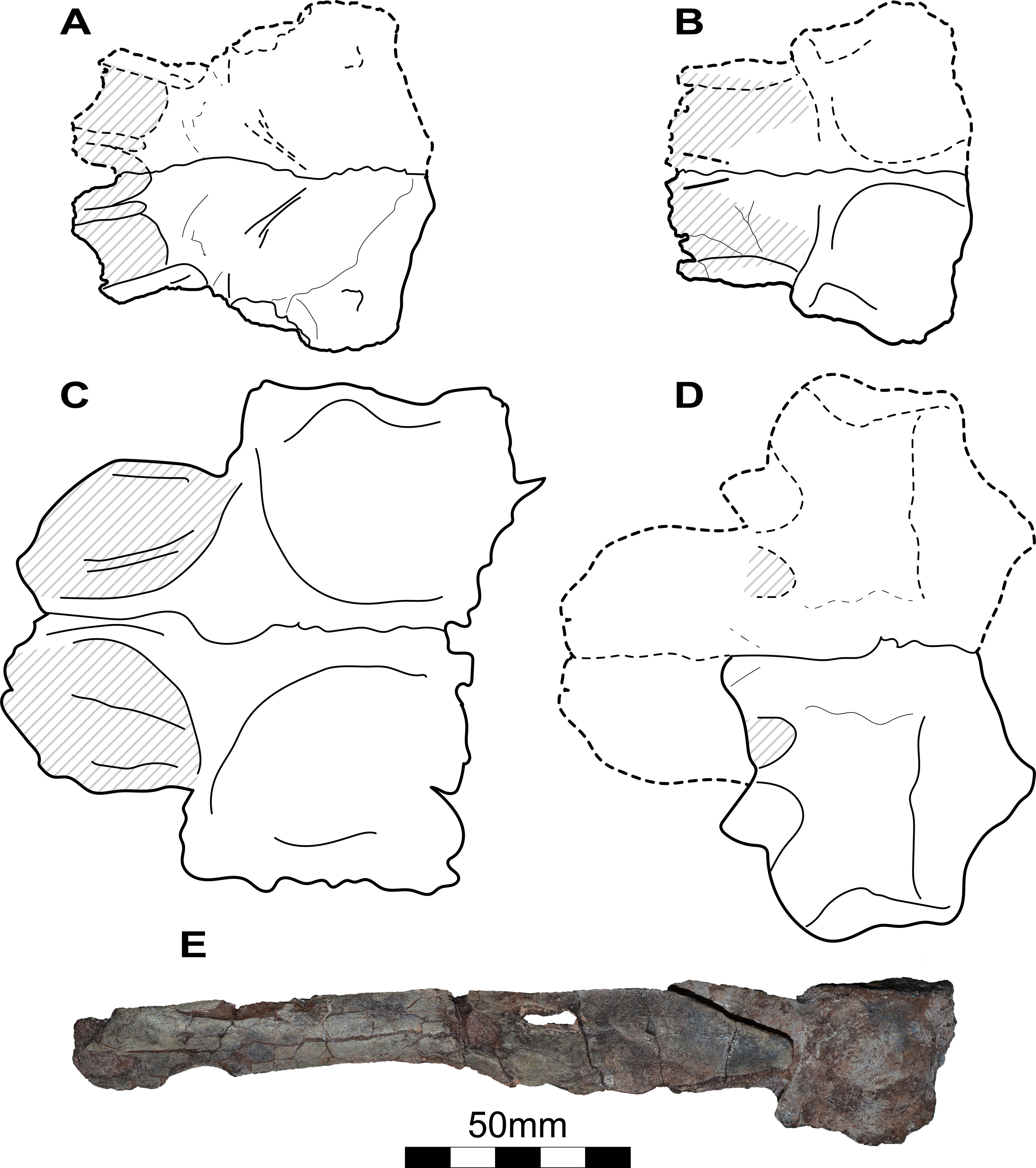
Megaraptorid frontal bones, B and E is Megaraptor

The lower jaw of M. namunhuaiquii is represented only by a left dentary, belonging to specimen MUCPv 1353. It is mostly complete, though has been extensively eroded. It is extremely elongated compared to many other theropods, closely resembling that of Australovenator. The alveolar process, the part of the dentary in which tooth sockets articulate, is difficult to make out. The tooth at the very front of the alveolar row may have projected forward slightly, although this may be an artefact of the poor preservation of the dentary. Neurovascular foramina are present throughout the dentary, more so than in Australovenator. The overall foramina count is closer to that of Neovenator.

Both of the M. namunhuaiquii specimens which preserve cranial material also preserve teeth. At least four teeth were present in each premaxilla, and presumably fifteen were present in each maxilla. As with other megaraptorans, as well as velociraptorine dromaeosaurs, M. namunhuaiquii's teeth had denticles only on the distal carina (the rearward edge). The teeth were heterodont, meaning that two different tooth shapes were present: the premaxillary teeth were short and conical, almost D-shaped, whereas the maxillary teeth were larger and more recurved. The combination of D-shaped premaxillary teeth and a heterodont dentition is seen in some dromaeosaurids, troodontids, and tyrannosauroids as a whole. The maxillary teeth of M. namunhuaiquii were proportionally shorter than the premaxillary row, and appear to have been more irregularly sized. Each dentary appears to have sported eighteen teeth, the same number as in Australovenator.

=== Postcranial skeleton ===
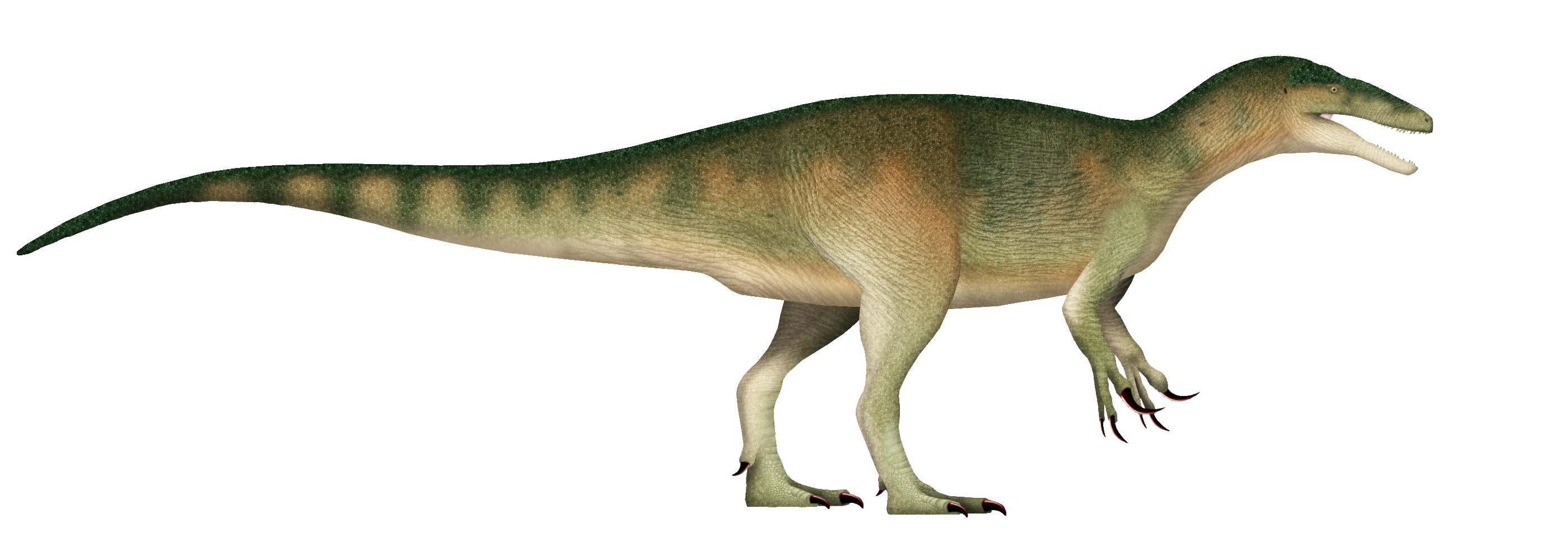
Restoration of an adult

Megaraptor's neck contained ten cervical vertebrae. The neural spine of the axis (the second cervical vertebra) was tall and narrow, with a convex dorsal margin, resembling basal coelurosaurs like Scipionyx, while differing from allosauroids and derived tyrannosauroids. All of the cervical vertebrae were opisthocoelous, meaning that they were convex anteriorly and concave posteriorly (towards the back). The torso of M. namunhuaiquii was fairly wide and deep, and contained twelve dorsal vertebrae. The first four neural spines were short dorsoventrally (top-to-bottom) and anteroposteriorly (front-to-back), while those further along the vertebral column were longer and taller. Eight gastralia, bones which support the abdominal organs and serve as muscle attachment points, are known. They resemble those of carcharodontosaurids and tyrannosaurids, while differing from those of most non-tyrannosaur coelurosaurs. The exception is Sinocalliopteryx, which has very similar gastralia. The gastralia were large, being slightly shorter than the dorsal ribs, similar to the condition seen in other large theropods. The sacrum, a mass of fused vertebrae which sat at the hips, contained five vertebrae. The caudal (tail) vertebrae of M. namunhuaiquii possessed blade-like neural spines as deep as those of Allosaurus. The anterior caudal vertebrae of MUCPv 595 at least bore an accessory (additional) posterior centrodiapophyseal lamina (a lamina connecting the vertebral centra to the diapophyses), which is also seen in Maip and Murusraptor. It is not certain whether such structures were present in other specimens.

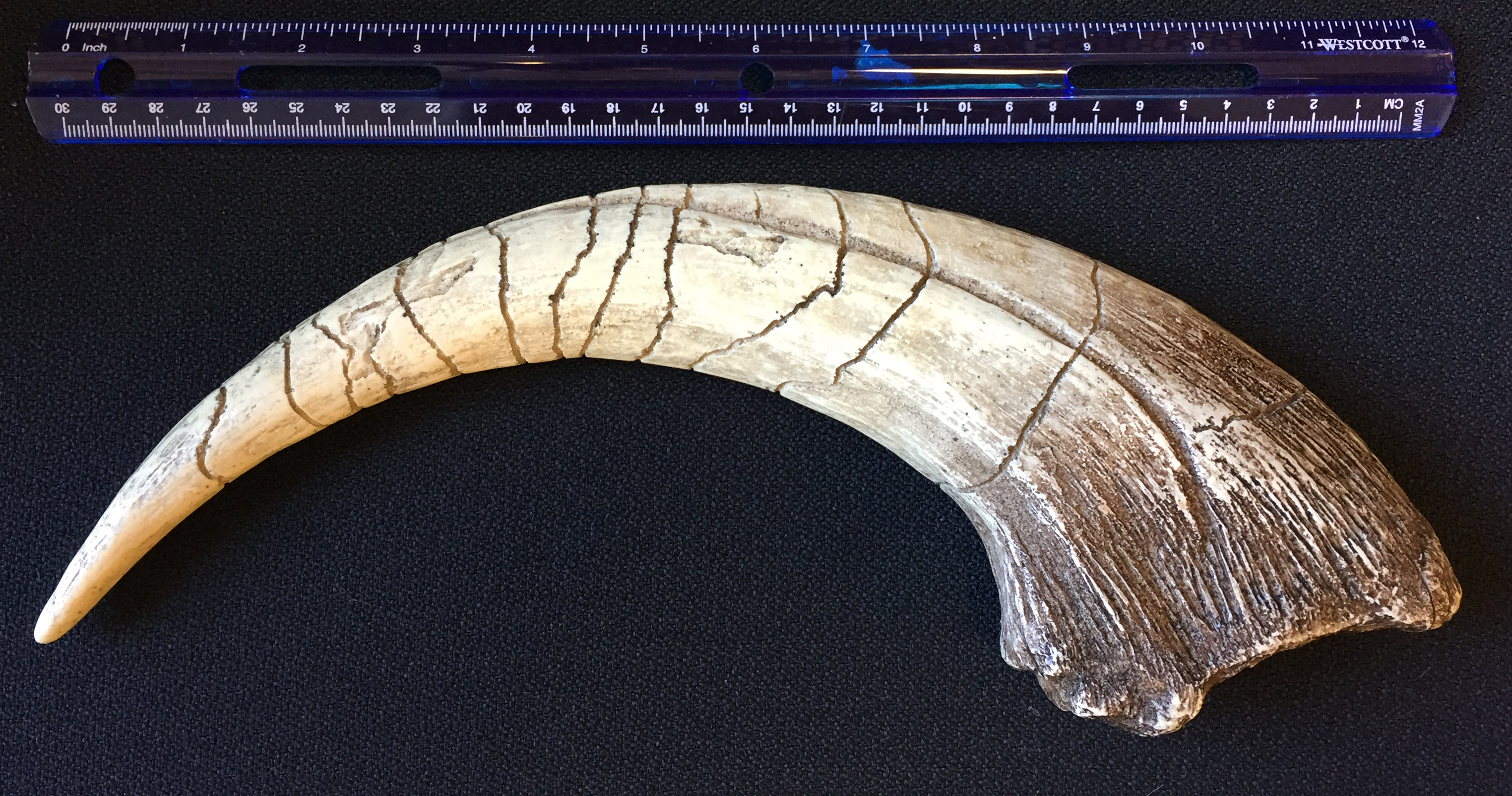
Claw cast with a ruler for scale

The pectoral girdle of Megaraptor differed from that of carcharodontosaurids in that its scapula was slenderer, and the acromial process was shallower, though resembled that of Allosaurus. The coracoid was almost flat, and had a developed biceps tuber. Characteristic of megaraptorans, there was a deep depression behind the glenoid. Though M. namunhuaiquii's humeri (upper arm bones) are poorly known, megaraptorans overall had large, robust deltopectoral crests, and large attachment sites for strong forelimb flexor and extensor muscles. M. namunhuaiquii's forearm, measured from the proximal (close to the body) end of the radius to the distal (far from the body) end of the first digit, measured 93.8 cm (36.9 in), with the manus alone comprising around 70 cm (28 in) of that. Though fragmentary, the carpals of M. namunhuaiquii are known to have been semi-lunate (crescent-shaped), similar to the related Australovenator and to certain coelurosaurs. It retains a fourth metacarpal, albeit with no phalanges (finger bones) attached; a similar condition is observed in the basal tyrannosauroid Guanlong and the metriacanthosaurid carnosaur Sinraptor. The hands were unusually elongate. The first ungual (the bone supporting the claw) was very large, around 35 cm (14 in) in length when measured along its curve. The second ungual was smaller 23.5 cm (9.3 in), while the third was the smallest 6.5 cm (2.6 in). Each of M. namunhuaiquii's unguals was strongly curved, more so than in spinosaurids. In life, they would have been considerably lengthened by a keratin sheath, possibly to a similar extent as the pedal (foot) claws of dromaeosaurids and modern birds of prey.

== Classification ==
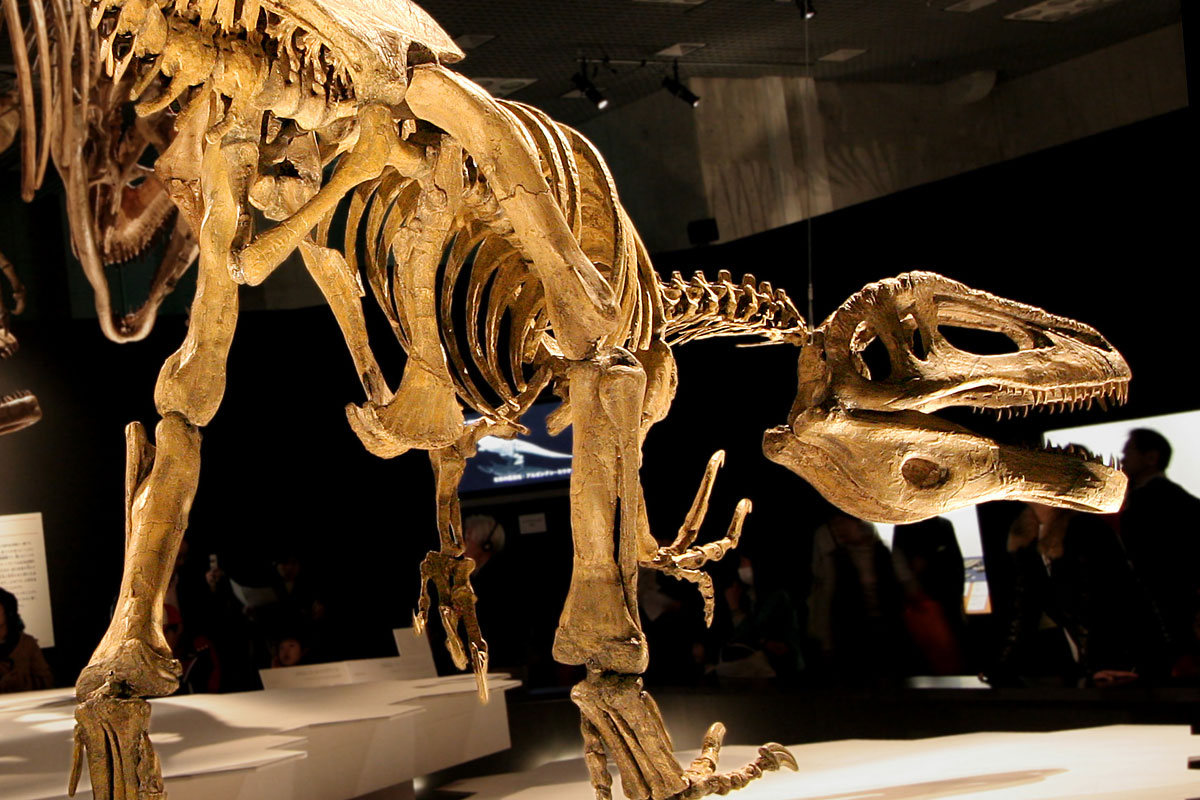
Earlier reconstruction with a carcharodontosaur-like skull and build

In his paper describing Megaraptor, Fernando Novas expressed uncertainty about its taxonomic position. While he tentatively placed it within Coelurosauria, and named it based on perceived similarities to dromaeosaurids and troodontids, he noted similarities to more basal theropod clades. In their reappraisal of the genus, Calvo and colleagues discounted the hypothesis that it was a coelurosaur, and suggested that it was instead a basal tetanuran, belonging to a clade that predated the split between allosauroids and coelurosaurs. A 2008 paper by Nathan D. Smith and colleagues suggested, based on an Australian ulna which resembled that of M. namunhuaiquii, that it may have been a cousin of spinosaurids. In 2012, Roger B. J. Benson, Matthew T. Carrano and Stephen L. Brusatte erected the clade Megaraptora to encompass M. namunhuaiquii and its closest relatives. Megaraptorans were placed within the family Neovenatoridae, and were therefore considered carcharodontosaurs, and the same result was recovered in several papers thereafter.

The below cladogram shows the results of the phylogenetic analysis performed by Zanno & Makovicky (2013), in their paper describing Siats:

- Allosauroidea
  - Metriacanthosauridae
  - Allosauria
    - Allosauridae
      - Allosaurus fragilis
      - Saurophaganax maximus
    - Carcharodontosauria
      - Neovenatoridae
        - Neovenator salerii
        - - Chilantaisaurus tashuikouensis
          - Megaraptora
            - Siats meekerorum
            - - Australovenator wintonensis
              - Fukuiraptor kitadaniensis
            - - Aerosteon riocoloradensis
              - Megaraptor namunhuaiquii
      - Carcharodontosauridae
        - - Eocarcharia dinops
          - Concavenator corcovatus
        - - Acrocanthosaurus atokensis
          - - Shaochilong maortuensis
            - Carcharodontosaurinae

The 2014 paper describing a juvenile M. namunhuaiquii suggested, based on a phylogenetic analysis, that megaraptorans were nested within Tyrannosauroidea. Their analysis recovered the bulk of Megaraptora in a polytomy, and recovered Eotyrannus, a basal tyrannosauroid, within it. Various studies have since suggested a connection between megaraptorans and tyrannosaurs. For example, the analysis of Novas and colleagues (2013) recovered megaraptorans as tyrannosauroids more derived than proceratosaurs, whereas a 2022 analysis by Ronaldo and colleagues recovered megaraptorans as the sister clade to Tyrannosauroidea. With the removal of Megaraptora from Neovenatoridae came the recognition of a new family, Megaraptoridae, consisting of Gondwanan taxa and defined as all megaraptorans closer to M. namunhuaiquii than to Fukuiraptor.

In their 2022 description of Maip macrothorax, Rolando and colleagues noted the recovery of two distinct megaraptorid clades: a more inclusive clade, comprising all megaraptorids except Fukuiraptor and Australovenator (shown below as "Clade A"), and a more exclusive clade of larger, entirely South American megaraptorids (shown below as "Clade B"). Like some previous analyses by other authors, Megaraptora is nested within Coelurosauria, as the sister taxon to Tyrannosauroidea. The cladogram below displays the megaraptoran results of the phylogenetic analyses by Rolando and colleagues (2022).

- Megaraptora
  - Phuwiangvenator
  - - Vayuraptor
    - Fukuiraptor
    - Megaraptoridae
      - Australian megaraptorid indet. (LRF 100–106)
      - - Australovenator
        - "Clade A"
          - Aoniraptor
          - - Bajo Barreal Formation megaraptorid indet. (UNPSJB-Pv 944/958)
            - - Megaraptor
              - - Murusraptor
                - "Clade B"
                  - Orkoraptor
                  - Tratayenia
                  - Maip
                  - Aerosteon

== Palaeobiology ==
Due to their anatomy, and perceived similarities with the carcharodontosaurid Mapusaurus roseae, Juan D. Porfiri, Domenica Dos Santos, and Jorge O. Calvo suggested in 2007 that Megaraptor may have used its forelimbs to open up carcasses, with the head serving as its primary weapon. At the same time, though, they drew comparisons with Deinonychus and affirmed that it was likely an active hunter like that genus. This interpretation predated the discovery of MUCPv 595 and the elucidation of M. namunhuaiquii's skull morphology, and in 2023, based on that new data, Aranciaga Ronaldo and colleagues indicated that they had a more conventional role in prey capture. The related Australovenator had very mobile forelimbs and wrists, possibly adapted to grip onto prey items and draw them towards the chest so that they could be dispatched via the jaws, and the same may have been true of megaraptorans overall, including M. namunhuaiquii itself. In the same paper as their initial proposal, Porfiri, Dos Santos and Calvo suggested based on the fact that several specimens had been found in close proximity that the taxon may have been somewhat social, specifically comparing it to lions and hyenas. However, it was later suggested that the association of these specimens may be the result of deceased individuals naturally accumulating post-mortem.

=== Sensory capabilities ===
A 2025 paper analysing Megaraptor's braincase, authored by Ariana Paulina-Carabajal and Juan D. Porfiri, found that the floccular processes, projections of the cerebellum whose anatomy may correlate to gaze and head stabilisation during rapid movement, were large by the standards of a basal coelurosaur. This suggests that Megaraptor's hunting method relied on a stable gaze and rapid movements, and consequently that it may have been a better pursuit predator than contemporary abelisaurids and Murusraptor. The olfactory apparatus, the structures correlating to its sense of smell, were small compared to those of carcharodontosaurids and tyrannosaurids, indicating that the role of olfaction in hunting was limited. Paulina-Carabajal and Porfiri used the length of the cochlear ducts and the length of the basisphenoid to calculate that Megaraptor had a mean hearing range of 2,317 Hz and an upper limit of 3,868 Hz, similar to the ranges calculated for the dromaeosaurid Velociraptor and the therizinosaur Falcarius. They did, however, acknowledge the limitations of using cochlear duct length to predict the acuity of hearing, and noted that the presence of tympanic sinuses (as in therizinosaurs) indicates that the actual hearing range was lower.

== Palaeoecology ==
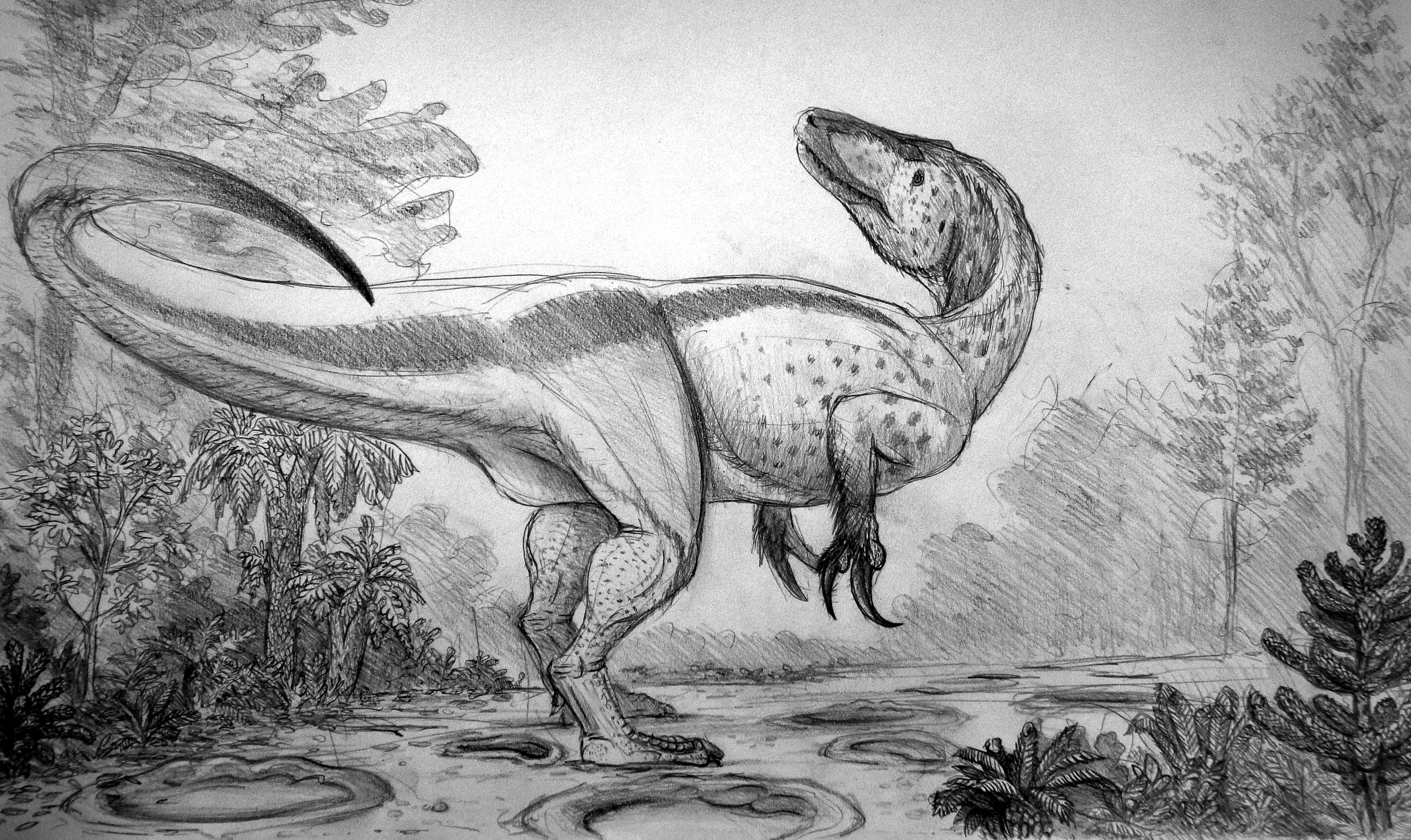
Hypothetical life restoration of an adult

Megaraptor is known from the Late Turonian to Early Coniacian-dated Portezuelo Formation of Argentina, part of the Río Neuquén Subgroup of the Neuquén Group. The depositional environment of the Portezuelo Formation was a meandering fluvial (river) system of varying sinuosity, with a humid climate.

Other dinosaurs known from the formation include the titanosaurian sauropods Futalognkosaurus, Baalsaurus, and Malarguesaurus, and several other theropod taxa including the dromaeosaurids Neuquenraptor, Pamparaptor, and Unenlagia, the alvarezsaurid Patagonykus, and the abelisaurid Elemgasem. Indeterminate remains belonging to an unnamed megaraptorid, a possible noasaurid, and ornithopods have also been recovered from the formation. Fossils of teleost fish (Leufuichthys), turtles (Portezueloemys and a species of Prochelidella), birds, and pterosaurs (Argentinadraco) are also known. Non-vertebrate fossils from the Portezuelo Formation include bivalves, invertebrate trace fossils referrable to Scoyenia, and leaf impressions from some kind of dicotyledonous plant.
