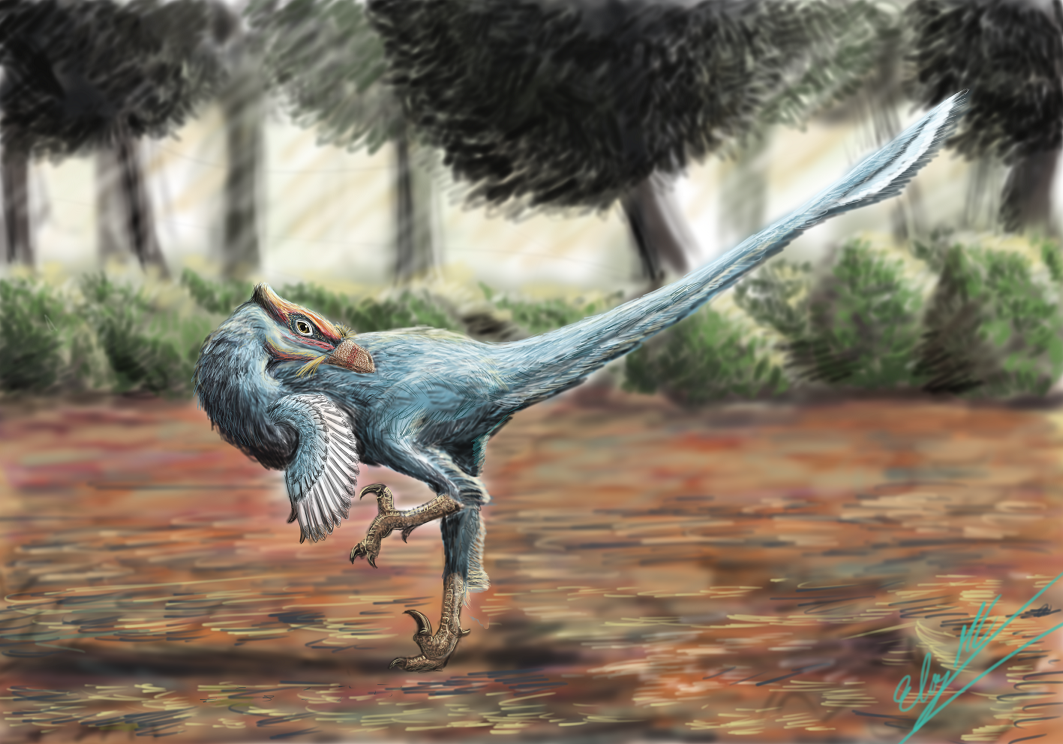
- Life restoration

Scientific classification
- Kingdom: Animalia
- Phylum: Chordata
- Class: Reptilia
- Clade: Dinosauria
- Clade: Saurischia
- Clade: Theropoda
- Clade: Paraves
- Family: †Dromaeosauridae
- Genus: †Pamparaptor; Porfiri, Calvo & Santos, 2011

Type species
- † Pamparaptor micros Porfiri, Calvo & Santos, 2011

= Pamparaptor =

Pamparaptor Temporal range: Late Cretaceous (Late Turonian), ~93.5–85.5 Ma

Extinct genus of dinosaurs

Pamparaptor (/ˈpɑːmpəræptər/, meaning "thief of the Pampas") is an extinct genus of paravian theropod dinosaur from the Late Cretaceous Portezuelo Formation of the Neuquén province in Argentine Patagonia. Its precise classification is uncertain, but the authors who described this taxon have argued that it is a dromaeosaurid. The genus contains a single species, P. micros (from the Greek word for "small"), which is known from a single specimen consisting of a mostly complete and fully-articulated left foot, which preserves the iconic dromaeosaur-like "killing claw".

== Discovery ==
The type and only specimen of Pamparaptor was discovered in 2005 by a technician named Diego Rosales who was working for the Lake Barreales Paleontological Center (or CePaLB) at the National University of Comahue. It was found at a locality called the "Baal Quarry", which is an outcrop of the Portezuelo Formation dated to the late Turonian or early Coniacian. The locality is on the northern shore of Lake Barreales Lake and about 90 kilometres (56 mi) northwest of the city of Neuquén.

The specimen was reposited at the National University of Comahue and was given the designation MUCPv-1163. It consists of all three metatarsals, a complete second toe including the ungual, and two phalanges each from the third and fourth toes from the left foot of the same animal. These elements were discovered in articulation with one another and so they can be reasonably inferred to have been from the same animal.

The holotype specimen of Pamparaptor was first reported in the literature in 2007 by the same researchers who would later go on to describe it. The specimen bore some similarities to the contemporaneous taxon Neuquenraptor, but was much smaller. For those reasons, MUCPv-1163 was believed to be a juvenile or subadult specimen of Neuquenraptor.

Pamparaptor was finally described as a new genus in a publication of the Annals of the Brazilian Academy of Sciences in 2010 by a team of researchers including Juan Porfiri, Jorge Calvo, and Domenica Dos Santos. The authors remarked in the paper that their description is brief, but explained that they are confident that the remains cannot belong to any pre-existing taxon known from the Portezuelo Formation.

== Description ==
Pamparaptor was a small dromaeosaur. The entire length of the metatarsal (the longest bone in the foot) is only about 9.3 centimetres (3.7 in). The specimen is highly incomplete, but Porfiri and colleagues used the size of the foot to estimate that the animal would have been between 0.5 metres (1.6 ft) and 0.7 metres (2.3 ft) long in life. They did not give an estimate of the animal's mass. Rubén Molina-Pérez and Asier Larramendi gave a slightly greater length estimate of about 1.15 metres (3.8 ft) long and they also gave a weight estimate of 2.6 kilograms (5.7 lb) in weight.

In their description of Pamparaptor, Porfiri and colleagues diagnose the genus as distinct from all other deinonychosaurs by the following synapomorphies: a slender and transversely compressed fourth metatarsal, an almost-equal length of the third and fourth metatarsals, a non-ginglymoidal joint on the distal end of the third metatarsal, a slight distal overlapping of the third metatarsal by the second, a proximal widening of the second metatarsal to double the width of either of the other two, a difference in length between the phalanges of the second toe, and a small sulcus on the distal end of the second metatarsal.

== Classification ==
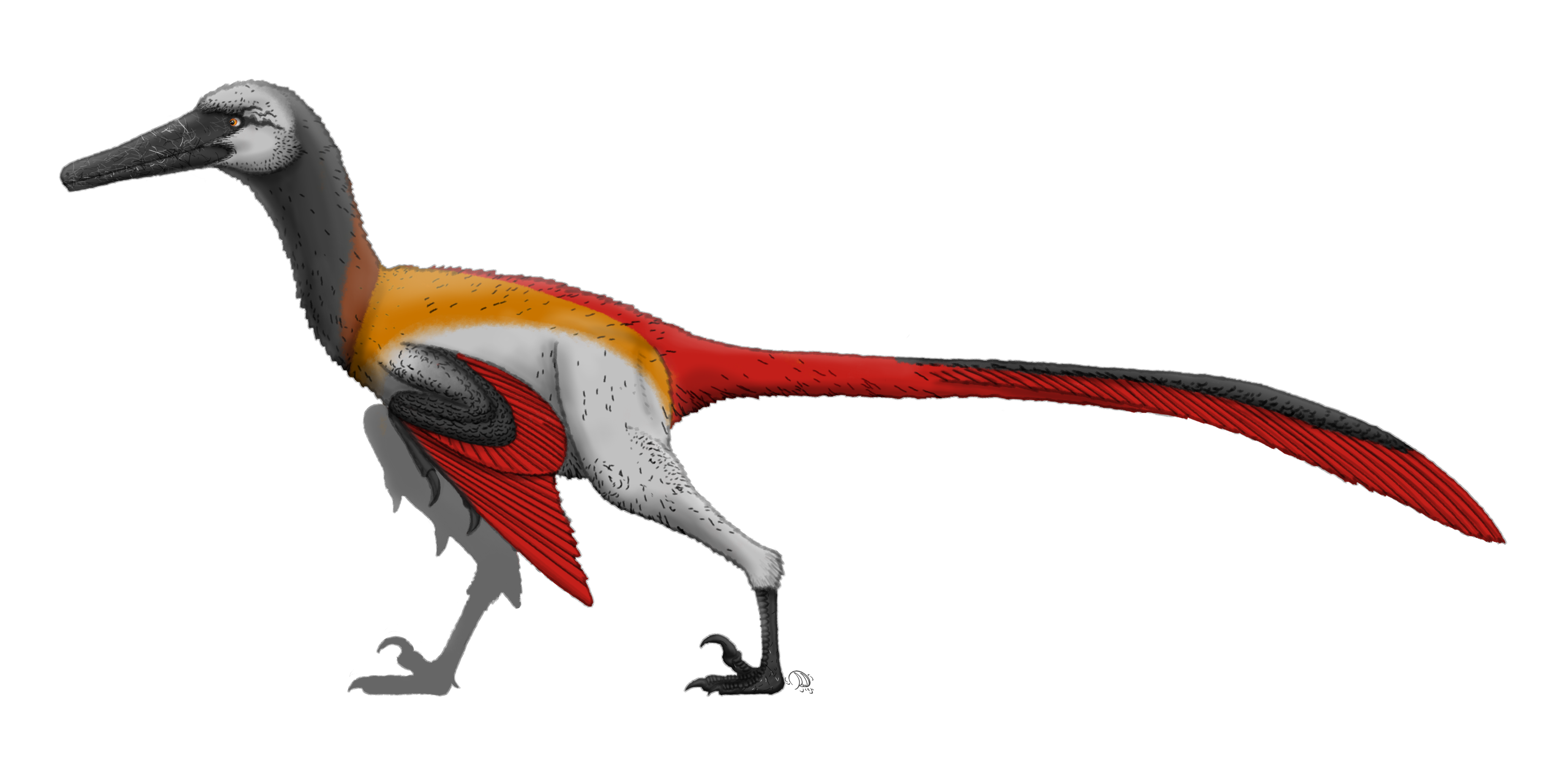
The anatomically similar unenlagiine Neuquenraptor

The discovery of Pamparaptor was originally reported in 2007 at a conference of the 23rd Argentine Conference of Vertebrate Paleontology by the same authors who would later describe it. In that publication, it was described as a juvenile specimen of the contemporaneous genus Neuquenraptor. This classification was in recognition of the similarity of the pedal morphology of MUCPv-1163 to the holotype of Neuquenraptor. In particular, it shares the proximal narrowing of the metatarsals, a large ridge on the lateral side of the second toe-claw, and a lateral expansion of the third metatarsal, which was believed to be an autapomorphy of Neuquenraptor.

Pamparaptor is now believed to represent its own genus and has been distinguished from Neuquenraptor by the lack of a significant difference in the ratio between the sizes of the metatarsals as well as the proportional size of the second toe-claw. Neuquenraptor and the possibly-related taxon Rahonavis both have much longer third metatarsals than fourth metatarsals. Pamparaptor also has phalanges of the first toe that exhibit a different proportional length to one another that is different from most other known dromaeosaurs like Dromaeosaurus, Deinonychus, and Velociraptor, but also including Neuquenraptor. The differences in these traits are not likely to be affected by ontogeny, according to the authors, and therefore they amended their referral and erected a new genus to contain the specimen. The traits that Pamparaptor exhibits are believed to be representative of the plesiomorphic condition in dromaeosauridae and was used by the authors to classify Pamparaptor as a basal non-unenlagiine dromaeosaurid.

Possible troodontid affinities were also examined for Pamparaptor due to several features of the foot anatomy that resembled troodontids. The length ratio of the third and fourth metatarsals is nearly 1:1, which is the condition seen in troodontids, and the bones of the feet also share a generally lightweight build. However, Porfiri and colleagues suggest that these similarities are only superficial, and they argue, based on a comparative analysis of dromaeosaurids and troodontids undertaken by Dale Russell and Zhi-Ming Dong in 1993, that several characters place Pamparaptor firmly as a dromaeosaur. They also rejected the earlier conclusion from other researchers that Neuquenraptor was a junior synonym of Unenlagia.

In their description of the taxon, Porfiri and colleagues did not conduct a phylogenetic analysis. They stated that the incomplete nature of the holotype combined with the overall scarcity of deinonychosaur fossils in Gondwana mean that any such analyses are likely to be highly incomplete. However, they do suggest that the discovery of aberrant taxa like Pamparaptor provide clues for the existence of an endemic lineage of dromaeosaurs distinct from the unenlagiines.

In 2018, Federico A. Gianechini, Peter J. Makovicky, Sebastián Apesteguía, and Ignacio Cerda published an osteological description of all remains referred to the genus Buitreraptor. In this paper, they conducted a phylogenetic analysis using 152 maniraptoran taxa coded for 853 characters based on the data set of Steve Brusatte and colleagues (2014). In their analysis, the inclusion of Pamparaptor led to a poorly-resolved tree with little support for any of the known monophyletic clades of maniraptorans. They elected to remove Pamparaptor, along with the problematic genera Kinnareemimus and Pyroraptor, from their final analysis, which resolved the consensus tree considerably. Therefore they do not make any concrete hypotheses regarding its phylogeny. In 2020, Michael Pittman and Xu Xing published a review of pennaraptoran systematics in which they suggest that Pamparaptor has affinities with the unenlagiines, but they do not make any further remarks on its classification, and it is not included in any of the trees they present. In a 2024 study, while the authors considered Pamparaptor as an unenlagiine based on phylogenetic analyses, Pamparaptor was also recovered as a sister taxon to various groups of paravians such as the anchiornithids, troodontids and microraptorian dromaeosaurids.

== Paleoecology ==
Location of the Portezuelo Formation in Argentina

=== Paleoenvironment ===
The Portezuelo Formation is a member of the Río Neuquén Subgroup which itself is a part of the Neuquén Group in the northern part of Patagonia. It overlies the Lisandro Formation and is in turn overlain by the Plottier Formation. During the Cretaceous period, this region was considerably further southeast than it is today.

The Portezuelo Formation is primarily composed of yellow and red-brown mudstones and siltstones which alternate with claystones and indicate the region contained an alluvial fan. This environment was eventually covered by paleosols, which mean that there was likely a long period of stability near the upper parts of the formation. The formation as a whole is about 95–130 metres (312–427 ft) thick, and was likely deposited over a period roughly from the late Turonian to the early Coniacian.

=== Contemporary fauna ===
Relatively few non-dinosaur vertebrates have been discovered from the Portezuelo Formation. They are generally limited to turtles, which are known to have at least two major groups, the chelids and the pelomedusoids, present in the region. This is an increase in the diversity of turtles from younger sediments, and is the earliest evidence for the appearance of modern pleurodire lineages. The remains of crocodyliformes have also been found, representing the named genus Patagosuchus and a second, unnamed notosuchian. However, the diversity of notosuchians in other Late Cretaceous formations of South America has led some researchers to suggest that there are more crocodyliformes that have yet to be discovered. At least one species of fish is also known from the waterways of the Portezuelo Formation.

The Baal Quarry locality is known for containing the holotype of Patagosuchus as well as the large theropod Megaraptor and the sauropod Baalsaurus. There is also a diverse assemblage of dinosaurs known from other localities within the formation. These include the large sauropods Futalognkosaurus and Malarguesaurus. Several coelurosaurs are also known including Patagonykus, an unnamed megaraptoran, and at least three other dromaeosaurs — Neuquenraptor and two species of Unenlagia. Several abelisauroids are known including one named form, Elemgasem, and at least two unnamed taxa. Fragmentary bones of iguanodontians have also been recovered, but none of these have been formally described.

== See also ==
- Biogeography of paravian dinosaurs
- Evolution of birds
- Timeline of dromaeosaurid research
