= Aguerre =

Aguerre is a surname. Notable people with the surname include:

- Gustavo Aguerre (born 1953), Argentine photographer, writer, and theatre designer
- Ignacio Álvarez Aguerre (born 1971), Uruguayan journalist and television presenter
- Mariano Aguerre (born 1969), Argentine polo player
- Washington Aguerre (born 1993), Uruguayan footballer

== See also ==
- Paso Aguerre, village and municipality in Neuquén Province, Argentina
