= Portezuelo Formation =

Geologic formation in Argentina

- Stratigraphic range: late Turonian–early Coniacian; ~90.5–88.5 Ma
- Type: Geological formation
- Unit of: Neuquén Group; Río Neuquén Subgroup
- Underlies: Los Bastos Formation
- Overlies: Lisandro Formation
- Thickness: 95–130 m (312–427 ft)

Lithology
- Primary: Sandstone
- Other: Conglomerate, limestone

Location
- Coordinates: 38.5°S 68.7°W
- Approximate paleocoordinates: 44.4°S 47.2°W
- Region: Mendoza, Río Negro & Neuquén Provinces
- Country: Argentina
- Extent: Neuquén Basin

Type section
- Named for: Sierra del Portezuelo
- Portezuelo Formation (Argentina)

The Portezuelo Formation is a geologic formation of Late Cretaceous (Late Turonian to Early Coniacian) age, outcropping in the Mendoza, Río Negro and Neuquén provinces of Argentina. It is the fourth-oldest formation in the Neuquén Group and the older of the two formations in the Río Neuquén Subgroup. Formerly, that subgroup was treated as a formation, and the Portezuelo Formation was known as the Portezuelo Member.

== Description ==
The type locality of the Portezuelo Formation is the mountain range known as Sierra del Portezuelo in Neuquén Province. This formation conformably overlies the Lisandro Formation of the Río Limay Subgroup. In the top layers it grades into the Plottier Formation, the younger formation within the Río Neuquén Subgroup.

Sandstones and siltstones, probably deposited under fluvial conditions, make up the Portezuelo Formation. There are also occasional cemented claystone deposits, as well as numerous paleosols (fossil soils). The formation varies between 95 and 130 metres (312 and 427 ft) thick throughout its range.

== Fossil content ==
Many dinosaur fossils have recently been described from this formation, as well as remains of several other types of animals:

- teleosteid fish including Leufuichthys
- ceratodontiform lungfish including Chaoceratodus
- abelisauroid theropods (A possible noasaurid and an abelisaurid)
- several other theropods, including a modern, possibly galliform bird
- ornithopods, including possible iguanodonts

=== Dinosaurs ===
==== Ornithischians ====
Color key: Taxon / Reclassified taxon / Taxon falsely reported as present / Dubious taxon or junior synonym / Ichnotaxon / Ootaxon / Morphotaxon

Notes
Uncertain or tentative taxa are in small text
~~crossed out~~ taxa are discredited.

Ornithischians of the Portezuelo Formation
Taxa	Species	Locality	Stratigraphic unit	Material	Notes	Images
Macrogryphosaurus	M. gondwanicus	The Mari Menuco lake		An incomplete skeleton of an adult individual which includes an almost complete vertebral column, eight cervical vertebrae, 14 dorsal vertebrae (complete series), six sacral vertebrae, thirteen caudal vertebrae, a cervical rib, eleven dorsal ribs; nine haemal arches, sternum, right and left pelvic girdles, and three thoracic mineralized plates.	An elasmarian ornithopod.	

==== Sauropods ====
Color key: Taxon / Reclassified taxon / Taxon falsely reported as present / Dubious taxon or junior synonym / Ichnotaxon / Ootaxon / Morphotaxon

Notes
Uncertain or tentative taxa are in small text
~~crossed out~~ taxa are discredited.

Sauropods of the Portezuelo Formation
Taxa	Species	Locality	Stratigraphic unit	Material	Notes	Images
Baalsaurus	B. mansillai			A mostly complete right dentary	A titanosaur	
Futalognkosaurus	F. dukei	Futalognko quarry		Atlas, axis, five anterior, four middle, and three poste-rior cervicals; 10 dorsals; ribs; complete sacrum; bothilia; right pubis and ischium; and one anterior caudal	A titanosaur	
Malarguesaurus	M. florenciae		Upper and Lower parts	A holotype consists of tail vertebrae, chevrons, ribs, and limb bones	A titanosaur	
Muyelensaurus	M. pecheni	Loma del Lindero site		A braincase including partial frontal and parietal, basioccipital, incomplete basipterygoid process, supraoccipital, exoccipital, basisphenoidals tubers, orbitosphenoids, and incomplete parasphenoids.	A titanosaur	

==== Theropods ====
Theropods of the Portezuelo Formation
Taxa	Species	Locality	Stratigraphic unit	Material	Notes	Images
Elemgasem	E. nubilus	Sierra del Portezuelo	Lower	A holotype consists of partial axial and appendicular elements, including cervical and caudal vertebrae, right femur, left tibia, right and left fibula, left astragalus-calcaneum, metatarsals, and various pedal phalanges	A abelisaur	Elemgasem nubilus Megaraptor namunhuaiquii Neuquenraptor argentinus Pamparaptor micros Patagonykus puertai Unenlagia comahuensis
Megaraptor	M. namunhuaiquii	Sierra del Portezuelo		A complete front limb, right ulna, and left manual phalanx.	A megaraptorid	Elemgasem nubilus Megaraptor namunhuaiquii Neuquenraptor argentinus Pamparaptor micros Patagonykus puertai Unenlagia comahuensis
Neuquenraptor	N. argentinus	Sierra del Portezuelo		A holotype consists of fragments of cervical vertebra, dorsal ribs, haemal arches, left proximal radius, right femur and distal tibia, proximal tarsals, and most of the foot of the left hindlimb.	A dromaeosaurid	Elemgasem nubilus Megaraptor namunhuaiquii Neuquenraptor argentinus Pamparaptor micros Patagonykus puertai Unenlagia comahuensis
Pamparaptor	P. micros	Baal Quarry		A holotype consists of three metatarsals, a complete second toe including the ungual, and two phalanges each from the third and fourth toes from the left foot	A dromaeosaurid	Elemgasem nubilus Megaraptor namunhuaiquii Neuquenraptor argentinus Pamparaptor micros Patagonykus puertai Unenlagia comahuensis
Patagonykus	P. puertai	Los Barriales Lake.		An incomplete but well-preserved skeleton consists of multiple vertebrae, the coracoids, a partial forelimb, pelvic girdle, and hindlimbs	An alvarezsaur.	Elemgasem nubilus Megaraptor namunhuaiquii Neuquenraptor argentinus Pamparaptor micros Patagonykus puertai Unenlagia comahuensis
Unenlagia	U. comahuensis	Sierra del Portezuelo	Upper	A partial skeleton lacking the skull but including vertebrae, a sacrum, ribs, chevrons, a scapula, a humerus, a partial pelvis, a femur and a tibia	A dromaeosaurid	Elemgasem nubilus Megaraptor namunhuaiquii Neuquenraptor argentinus Pamparaptor micros Patagonykus puertai Unenlagia comahuensis
Unenlagia	U. paynemili	Futalognko site	Upper	Several paratypes consists of a partial skeleton consisting of a humerus, vertebrae, claw, phalanx, and two pubes.	A dromaeosaurid	Elemgasem nubilus Megaraptor namunhuaiquii Neuquenraptor argentinus Pamparaptor micros Patagonykus puertai Unenlagia comahuensis

=== Crocodyliformes ===
Reptiles of the Portezuelo Formation
Taxa	Species	Locality	Stratigraphic unit	Material	Notes	Images
Comahuesuchus	C. bonapartei	The Futalognko quarry	Upper	A partially preserved (cranial-most region) of the right mandible	A notosuchian crocodylomorphs.	
Lomasuchus	L. palpebrosus	Loma de la Lata		Skull and fragment of the left mandibular ramus	A peirosaurid notosuchian.	
Patagosuchus	P. anielensis	Baal Quarry, Loma de la Lata		A fragmentary left dentary and splenial, the right maxilla and right jugal bone, a back vertebra, a back osteoderm and the right humerus.	A peirosaurid crocodyliform.	

=== Pterosaurs ===
Pterosaurs of the Portezuelo Formation
Taxa	Species	Locality	Stratigraphic unit	Material	Notes	Images
Argentinadraco	A. barrealensis	Centro Paleontológico Lago Barreales	Upper	A single partial lower jaw, missing the rear end	An azdarchoid pterosaur.	

=== Turtles ===
Turtles of the Portezuelo Formation
Taxa	Species	Locality	Stratigraphic unit	Material	Notes	Images
Baalemys	B. mansillai	Baal Quarry, Lago Barreales	Upper	A shell	A chelid turtle	
Elkanemys	E. caelestis	Sierra del Portezuelo	Upper	A shell	A bothremydid turtle	
Portezueloemys	P. patagonica	Sierra del Portezuelo	Upper	A partial shell	A pleurodiran turtles	
Prochelidella	P. portezuelae	Sierra del Portezuelo	Upper	A set of postcrania	A pleurodiran turtles	

== See also ==
- List of fossil sites
- List of dinosaur bearing rock formations
