= Picún Leufú =

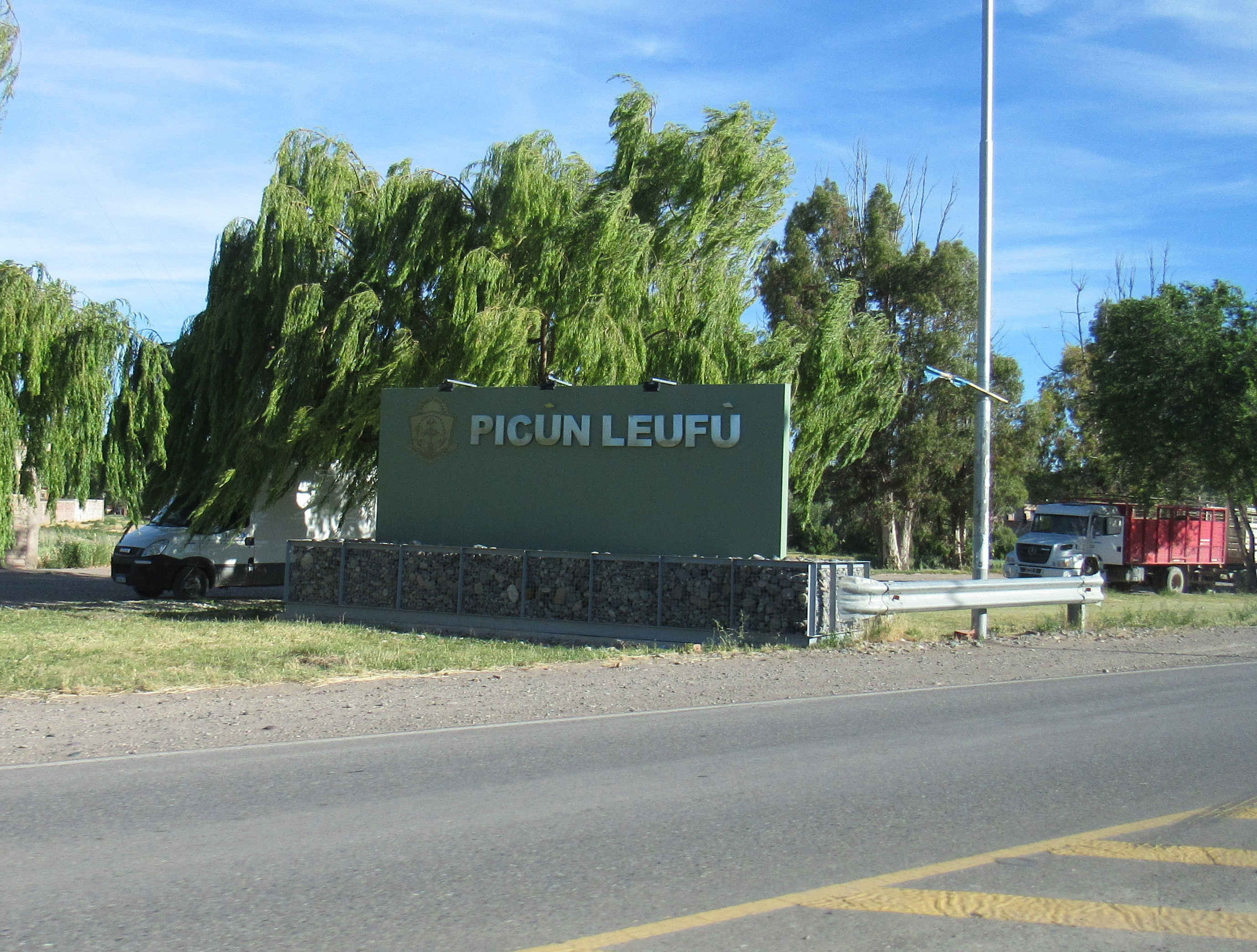
- Acceso Picún Leufú

- Location within Neuquén Province Location within Argentina
- Coordinates: 39°31′S 69°15′W
- Country: Argentina
- Province: Neuquén Province
- Department: Picún Leufú Department
- Founded: October 20, 1915

Government
  - Mayor: Anibal Gerez
- Elevation: 411 m (1,348 ft)

Population (2001 census [INDEC])
  - Total: 2,687
- Time zone: UTC−3 (ART)
- CPA Base: Q 8313
- Area code: +54 02942
- Climate: BWk

Picún Leufú is a second category municipality and the capital of Picún Leufú Department located in Neuquén Province, Argentina.

== History ==
Picún Leufú was established on September 12, 1971.

== Culture ==
The name of the town comes from Mapudungun and it means North River.
