= Picún Leufú Department =

Coordinates: 39°31′07″S 69°17′28″W

Picún Leufú
- Department
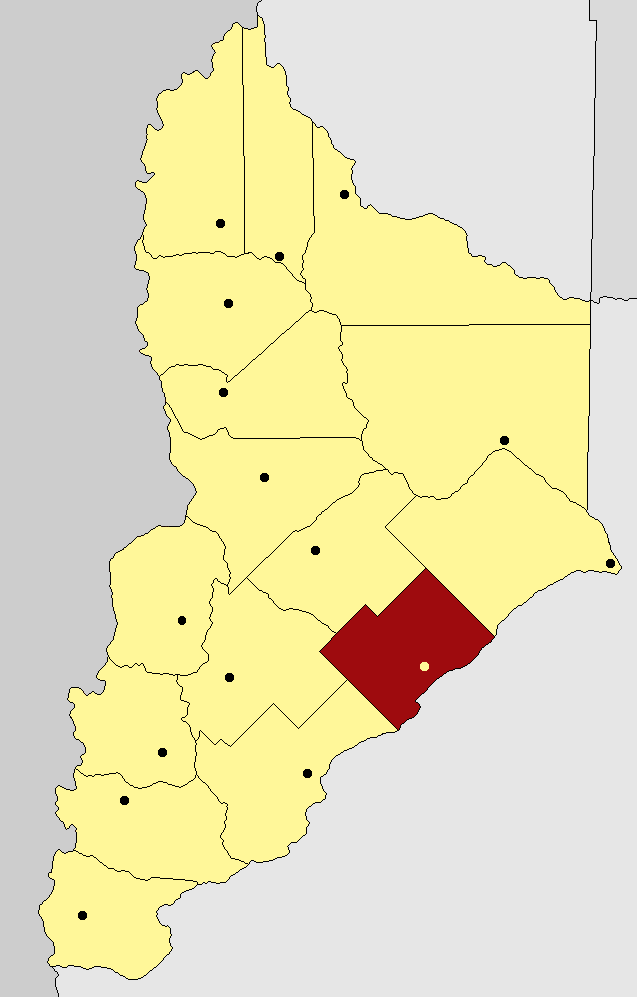
- Country: Argentina
- Province: Neuquén
- Capital: Picún Leufú

Area
  - Total: 4,580 km^{2} (1,770 sq mi)

Population (2022)
  - Total: 5,087
  - Density: 1.11/km^{2} (2.88/sq mi)
- Important cities: Picún Leufú: El Sauce; Limay Centro; Paso Aguerre; Aguada del Carrizo

Picún Leufú is a department located in the east of Neuquén Province, Argentina.

== Geography ==
The Department limits with Confluencia Department at northeast, Rio Negro Province at southeast, Collón Curá Department at southwest, Catán Lil Department at west and Zapala Department at northwest.
