= Fernando Novas =

Argentine paleontologist (born 1960)

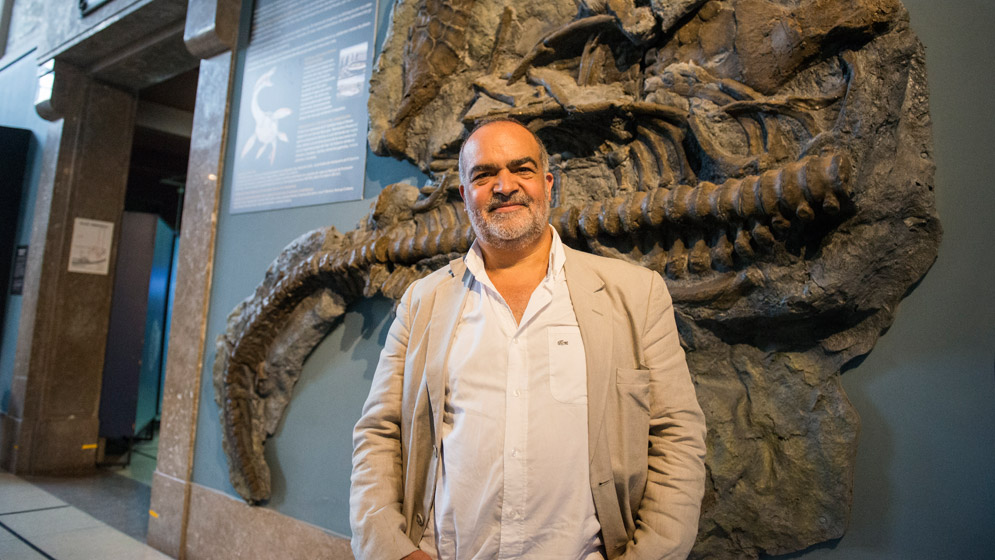
Novas in 2018

Fernando Emilio Novas (born 1960) is an Argentine paleontologist working for the Comparative Anatomy Department of the Bernardino Rivadavia Natural Sciences Museum in Buenos Aires, Argentina. Novas holds a PhD in Natural sciences.

Working for the CONICET, he described or co-described many dinosaurs, among them Abelisaurus, Aniksosaurus, Aragosaurus, Austroraptor, Chilesaurus, Megaraptor, Neuquenraptor, Orkoraptor, Patagonykus, Unenlagia, Araucanoraptor, Skorpiovenator, Tyrannotitan, Talenkauen, and Puertasaurus, most from the Patagonia region of Argentina. Chilesaurus diegosuarezi made the cover of Nature magazine on 18 June 2015. In 2023, he was granted the Konex Award Merit Diploma for his work in paleontology in the last decade.
