= Jorge O. Calvo =

Argentine geologist and paleontologist (1961–2023)

Jorge Orlando Calvo
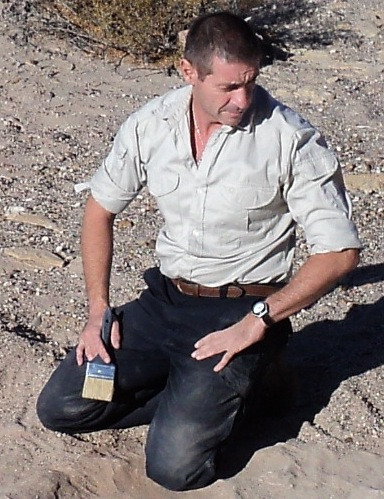
- Calvo in 2011
- Born: 27 April 1961; Córdoba, Argentina
- Died: 10 January 2023 (aged 61); Neuquén, Argentina
- Education: Universidad Nacional de Córdoba, (Geology, 1986); University of Illinois at Chicago (Master of Sciences (postgraduate, 1994); Federal University of Rio de Janeiro, Brazil (Doctor of Zoology, 2006)
- Known for: Important contributions to the study of Dinosaur Paleontology; founder of Proyecto DINO: Centro Paleontológico Lago Barreales
- Scientific career
- Fields: Paleontology (vertebrate)
- Workplaces: National University of Comahue National University of La Pampa

Jorge Orlando Calvo (27 April 1961 – 10 January 2023) was an Argentine geologist and paleontologist working for "Centro de Investigaciones Paleontológicas Lago Barreales" (National University of Comahue).

== Life and career ==
Jorge Orlando Calvo was born in Córdoba, Argentina, on 27 April 1961. He was a professor in Geology and Paleontology at the National University of Comahue, Neuquén. He was one of the founders of the Geology Career (2010) at this university as well as the Director of the Barreales Lake Paleontological Center.

Calvo became a geologist in 1986 and in 1991 he won a Fulbright scholarship to do a Master in Paleontological Sciences (1992) at the University of Illinois Chicago, getting his degree in 1994. In 2006, he earned his PhD degree at the Federal University of Rio de Janeiro, Brazil.

Calvo devoted his life to the discovering, digging and studying of Vertebrate Paleontology. He was the first palaeontologist to live and work in the Neuquén province. He was both author and co-author of many discoveries of his own about new taxa in dinosaurs, birds, crocodiles, frogs, turtles, eggs and dinosaur tracks. Calvo was the first palaeontologist to have helped develop not only the Paleontological Science in Norpatagonia (1987), but also the Paleontological Tourism. He was the founder of the Geology and Paleontology Museum of the National University of Comahue (1990), the Paleontological Museum of Rincón de los Sauces (2000) and the Barreales Lake Paleontological Center (2002).

As a researcher of the National University of Comahue, he was the Director of more than 15 national and international research projects led from institutions such as Conicet, Agencia Nacional de Ciencia y Tecnologia and Universidad Nacional del Comahue (Argentina), Duke Foundation of United States, Dinosaur Society of America, National Geographic Society, etc.

Calvo was the director of theses for graduates, masters and PhD students. He published more than 88 scientific papers and more than 60 in non-specialist magazines. He also read more than 135 papers and lectures at Congresses of the specialty worldwide.

Calvo was invited to lecture on dinosaurs from Norpatagonia in different cities of Argentina, Brazil, Chile, Italy, Finland, Romania and Serbia. He was also a coordinator in more than 25 events of paleontological shows, exhibitions and Interactive museums.

He both described and co-described many species:

- Andesaurus delgadoi Calvo & Bonaparte, 1991
- Picunichnus benedettoi Calvo, 1991 (a)
- Sauropodichnus giganteus Calvo, 1991 (a)
- Sousaichnium monetae Calvo, 1991 (a)
- Deferrariischnium mapuchensis Calvo, 1991 (a)
- Limayichnus major Calvo, 1991 (a)
- Neuquenornis volans Chiappe & Calvo, 1994
- Limaysaurus tessonei Calvo & Salgado, 1995 (b)
- Megaloolithus patagonicus Calvo, Engelland, Heredia & Salgado, 1997 (c)
- Avitabatrachus uliana Báez, Trueb & Calvo, 2000
- Araripesuchus patagonicus Ortega, Gasparini, Buscalioni & Calvo, 2000
- Anabisetia saldiviai Coria & Calvo, 2002
- Rinconsaurus caudamirus Calvo & González Riga, 2003
- Unenlagia paynemili Calvo, Porfiri & Kellner, 2004
- Ekrixinatosaurus novasi Calvo, Rubillar-Rogers & Moreno, 2004
- Puertasaurus reuili Novas, Salgado, Calvo & Agnolin, 2005
- Pehuenchesuchus enderi Turner & Calvo, 2005
- Futalognkosaurus dukei Calvo, Porfiri, González Riga & Kellner, 2007
- Neuquensuchus universitas Fiorelli & Calvo, 2007
- Muyelensaurus pecheni Calvo, González Riga & Porfiri, 2007
- Macrogryphosaurus gondwanicus Calvo, Porfiri & Novas, 2007
- Linderochelys rinconensis De la Fuente, Calvo & Gonzalez Riga, 2007
- Austroraptor cabazai Novas, Pol, Canale, Porfiri & Calvo, 2009
- Titanopodus mendozensis Gonzalez Riga & Calvo, 2009
- Panamericansaurus schroederi Calvo & Porfiri, 2010
- Willinakaqe salitralensis R. D. Juárez Valieri, J. A. Haro, L. E. Fiorelli & J. O. Calvo, 2010
- Pamparaptor micros J. D. Porfiri, J. O. Calvo and D. Dos Santos, 2011
- Leufuichthys minimus Gallo, Calvo & Kellner, 2011
- Traukutitan eocaudata Juárez Valieri & Calvo, 2011
- Notocolossus gonzalezparejasi B. J. González Riga, M. C. Lamanna, L. D. Ortiz David, J. O. Calvo & J. P. Coria, 2016

He died on 10 January 2023, aged 61, in Neuquén, Argentina.
