= Leufuichthys =

Leufuichthys Temporal range: Turonian-Coniacian ~94.3–85.8 Ma

Scientific classification
- Domain: Eukaryota
- Kingdom: Animalia
- Phylum: Chordata
- Class: Actinopterygii
- Superorder: Clupeomorpha
- Genus: †Leufuichthys; Gallo, Calvo & Kellner, 2011

Type species
- Leufuichthys minimus Gallo, Calvo & Kellner, 2011

Extinct genus of fishes

Leufuichthys ("Leufú fish") is an extinct genus of clupeomorph fish which existed in Patagonia, Argentina during the late Cretaceous epoch (Turonian or Coniacian stage). It is known from the holotype – MUCPv 371, an incomplete specimen missing most of the cephalic skeleton and from the paratypes – MUCPv 344 incomplete specimen lacking head; MUCPv 346, incomplete specimen lacking most of skull; MUCPv 347, specimen bearing scales; MUCPv 348, incomplete specimen with skull and part of trunk. Leufuichthys was recovered from the Portezuelo Formation of the Rio Neuquén Subgroup (Neuquén Group). It was first named by Valéria Gallo, Jorge O. Calvo and Alexander W.A. Kellner in 2011 and the type species is Leufuichthys minimus.
