= Paso Aguerre =

- Municipality and village
- Location within Neuquén Province Location within Argentina
- Coordinates: 39°20′17″S 69°50′35″W
- Country: Argentina
- Province: Neuquén Province
- Time zone: UTC−3 (ART)
- Climate: BSk

Paso Aguerre is a village and municipality in Neuquén Province in southwestern Argentina.
