= Neuquenraptor =

Neuquenraptor Temporal range: Late Cretaceous ~90 Ma
- Diagram featuring the known elements and size of the holotype specimen

Scientific classification
- Kingdom: Animalia
- Phylum: Chordata
- Class: Reptilia
- Clade: Dinosauria
- Clade: Saurischia
- Clade: Theropoda
- Subfamily: †Unenlagiinae
- Genus: †Neuquenraptor; Novas & Pol, 2005
- Species: †N. argentinus

Binomial name
- †Neuquenraptor argentinus Novas & Pol, 2005

Extinct genus of dinosaurs

Neuquenraptor (meaning Neuquén thief) is a genus of unenlagiine theropod dinosaurs that lived in South America during the Late Cretaceous in what is now the Portezuelo Formation of Argentina. It is one of the first dromaeosaurids found in the Southern Hemisphere.

== Discovery and naming ==
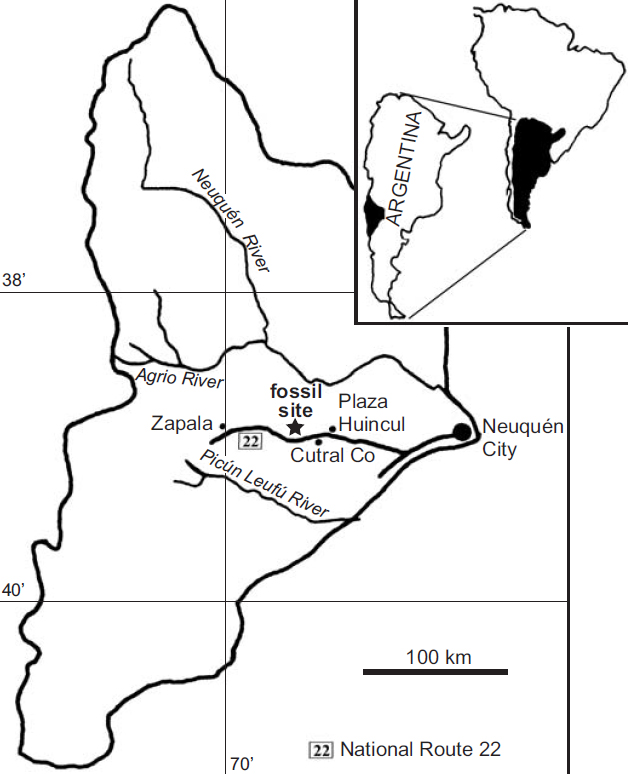
The Sierra del Portezuelo fossil site

In January 1996 the remains of Neuquenraptor were found near Plaza Huincul in the Sierra del Portezuelo and reported that very year. In 1997 it was revealed the intended name was "Araucanoraptor argentinus". In 1999 it was provisionally described as a member of the Troodontidae. However, it was named as the type species Neuquenraptor argentinus in 2005 by Fernando Novas of the Bernardino Rivadavia Natural Sciences Museum and Diego Pol of Ohio State University and described as a dromaeosaurid. The generic name combines Neuquén, referring to the Neuquén Province and basin of northern Patagonia, Argentina, with Latin raptor meaning "thief". The specific name refers to Argentina.

== Description ==
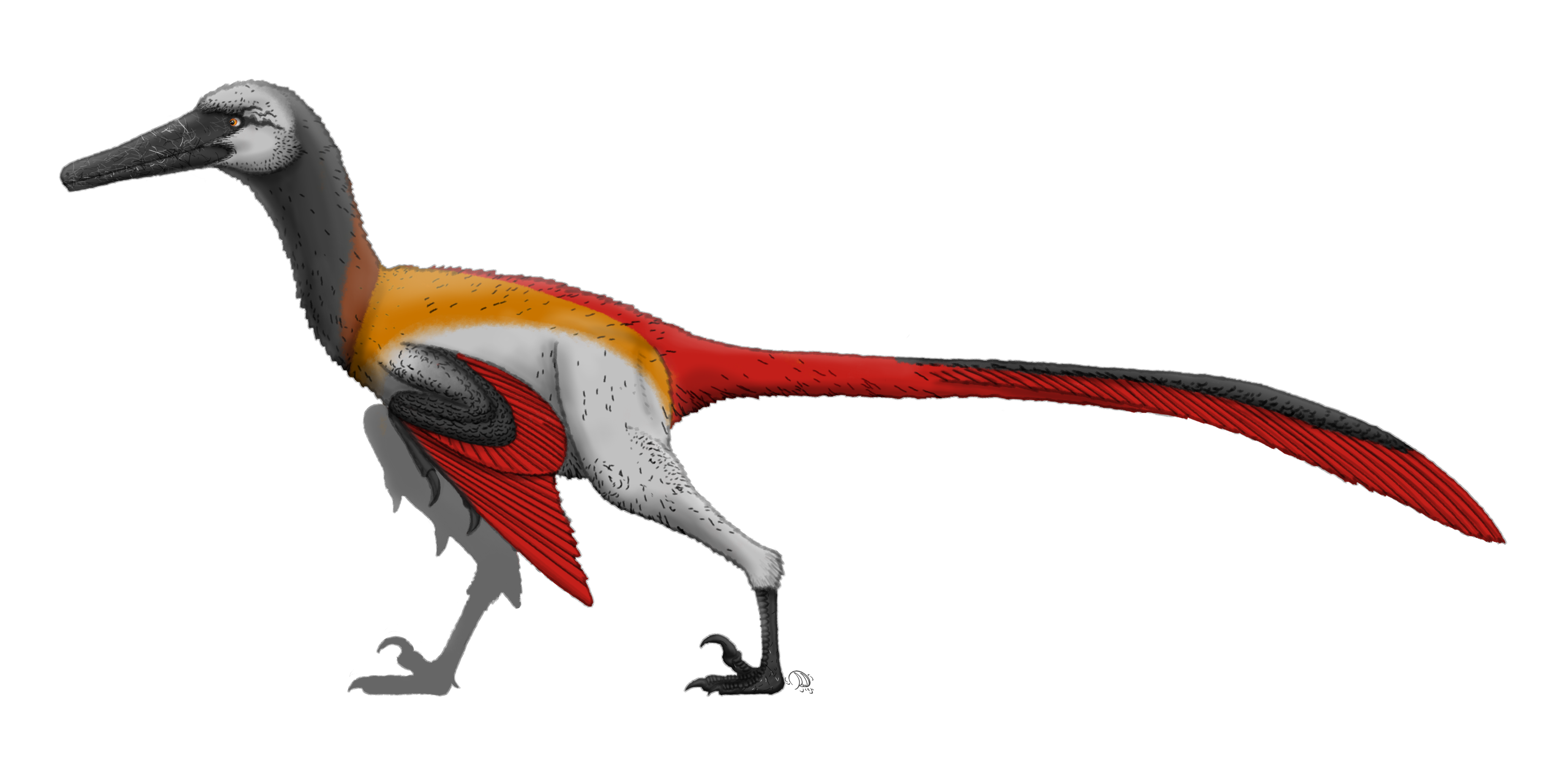
Speculative life restoration

The known remains, holotype MCF-PVPH 77, were uncovered in layers of the Portezuelo Formation dating to the Coniacian. It consists of only a left foot, some cervical vertebrae fragments, ribs, tail chevrons and a radius.

Neuquenraptor is estimated to have measured 1.8–3.5 m (5.9–11.5 ft) long and have weighed 75 kg (165 lb). It was larger than its close relative Buitreraptor, a genus it shared some osteological and physical similarities with.

== Classification ==
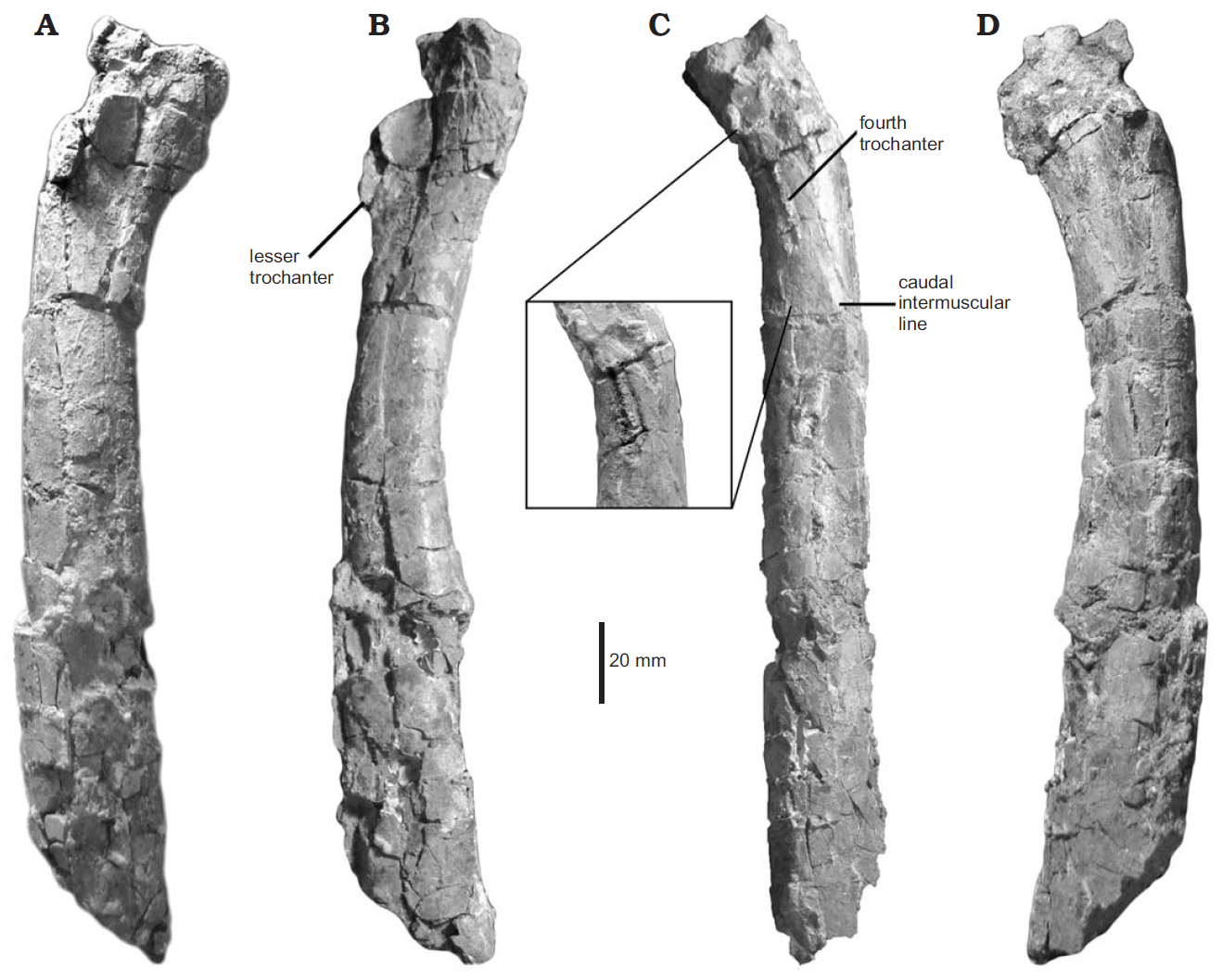
Rright femur

Neuquenraptor might be a junior subjective synonym of Unenlagia; that is, the two might represent the same genus or even species, in which case the name Unenlagia would have to be used instead of Neuquenraptor because the former name was published earlier, in 1997, and thus has priority. In 2005, Neuquenraptor was assigned by Novas and Pol to the Dromaeosauridae in a polytomy with several dromaeosaurid taxa. Some subsequent studies did not treat Neuquenraptor as a valid genus, combining its data with that of Unenlagia into a single unit. Motta et al. (2025), who recovered Unenlagiidae (along with Halszkaraptoridae, Anchiornithidae, and Archaeopteryx) as within Avialae, considered both Neuquenraptor and Unenlagia to be separate, valid genera.

== Paleoecology ==
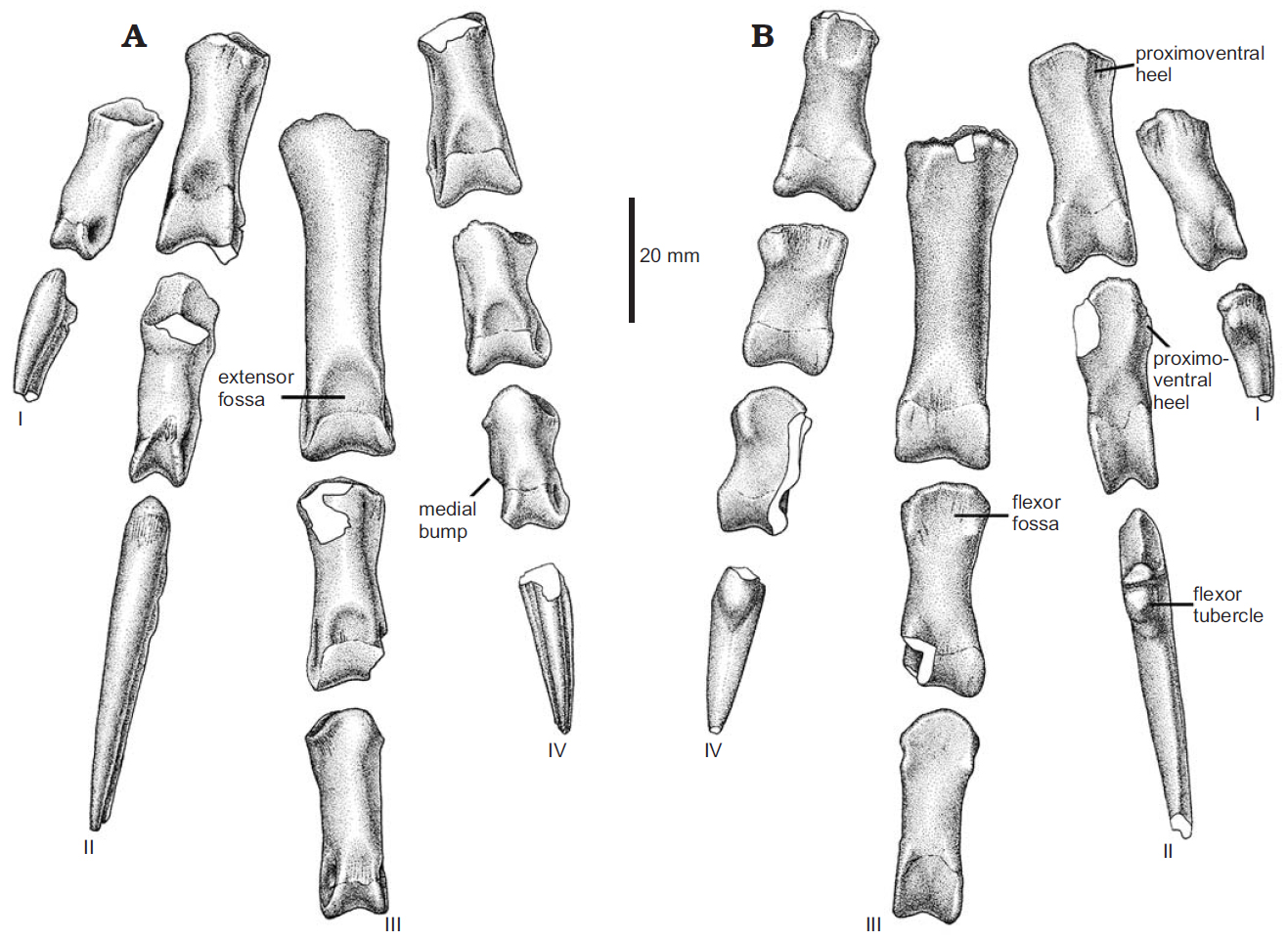
Toe bones

Neuquenraptor enjoys a special importance because of its provenance from South America. Until the discovery of Neuquenraptor, all dromaeosaurids had been found in North America, Europe or Northern China / Mongolia, and scientists believed that dromaeosaurids only inhabited Laurasia, i.e. the Northern Hemisphere. South America however, during the Mesozoic became part of Gondwana. The find of Neuquenraptor provides some possible indication of the degree of isolation between the Northern and Southern hemispheres.

The supercontinent Pangaea started to break up in the Early Jurassic, leading to the separation around 160 Ma of Laurasia in the north and Gondwana in the south. Gondwana itself was soon fragmented into West Gondwana (i.e., Africa and South America) and East Gondwana (i.e., Antarctica and Australia plus India and Madagascar). West Gondwana broke apart during the Cretaceous, as Africa and South America separated between 132 and 90 Ma. Between approximately 80 and 60 Ma, i.e. in the Late Cretaceous and early Paleocene, North America and South America were perhaps connected, at least episodically, by a land bridge, due to the eastward motion of the Caribbean plate between the two continental masses.

== See also ==
- Timeline of dromaeosaurid research
