= Malarguesaurus =

Malarguesaurus Temporal range: upper Turonian-lower Coniacian ~90.5–88.5 Ma

Scientific classification
- Kingdom: Animalia
- Phylum: Chordata
- Class: Reptilia
- Clade: Dinosauria
- Clade: Saurischia
- Clade: †Sauropodomorpha
- Clade: †Sauropoda
- Clade: †Macronaria
- Clade: †Titanosauria
- Genus: †Malarguesaurus; González Riga et al. 2008

Type species
- †Malarguesaurus florenciae González Riga et al. 2008

Extinct genus of dinosaurs

Malarguesaurus (meaning "Malargue lizard" after the Malargüe Department of Mendonza Province) is a genus of titanosauriform sauropod dinosaur from the Late Cretaceous of Mendoza Province, Argentina. Its fossils, consisting of tail vertebrae, chevrons, ribs, and limb bones, were found in the upper Turonian-lower Coniacian Portezuelo Formation of the Neuquén Group. The type species, described by González Riga et al. in 2008, is M. florenciae.

== Description ==
Described as a robust sauropod, it was initially described as being closely related to Ligabuesaurus and Phuwiangosaurus, and Mannion et al. (2013) more precisely recovered it as a member of Somphospondyli. The cladistic analysis of Patagotitan recovered Malarguesaurus as a close relative of the Asian Ruyangosaurus.

Like other sauropods, Malarguesaurus would have been a large quadrupedal herbivore. Malarguesaurus is the second sauropod dinosaur discovered in Mendoza Province; the first is Mendozasaurus neguyelap.
