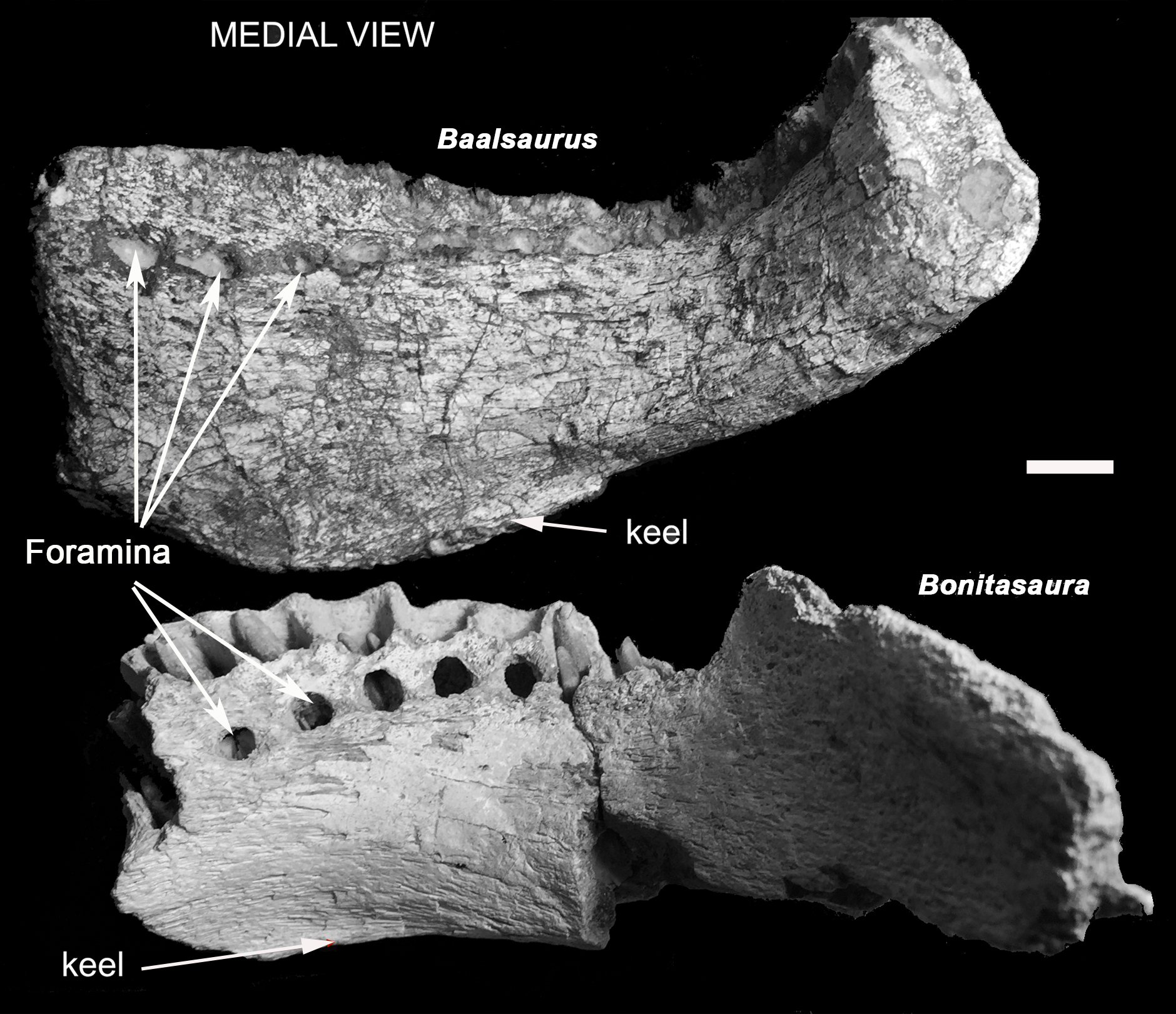
- Jaw of Bonitasaura (bottom) compared to that of Baalsaurus (top)

Scientific classification
- Kingdom: Animalia
- Phylum: Chordata
- Class: Reptilia
- Clade: Dinosauria
- Clade: Saurischia
- Clade: †Sauropodomorpha
- Clade: †Sauropoda
- Clade: †Macronaria
- Clade: †Titanosauria
- Genus: †Baalsaurus; Calvo & González Riga, 2018
- Species: †B. mansillai

Binomial name
- †Baalsaurus mansillai Calvo & González Riga, 2018

= Baalsaurus =

Baalsaurus Temporal range: Late Turonian-Early Coniacian ~91–88 Ma

Genus of titanosaurian dinosaur from the Late Cretaceous period

Baalsaurus (named after the dinosaur fossil site Baal in Argentina, which in turn is named after the ancient Phoenician god Baal) is a genus of titanosaurian sauropod dinosaur from the Late Cretaceous of Neuquén Province, Patagonia, Argentina. The type and only known species is B. mansillai, with the specific name honoring the discoverer Juan Eduardo Mansilla, a museum technician at the Geology and Paleontology Museum of the National University of Comahue.

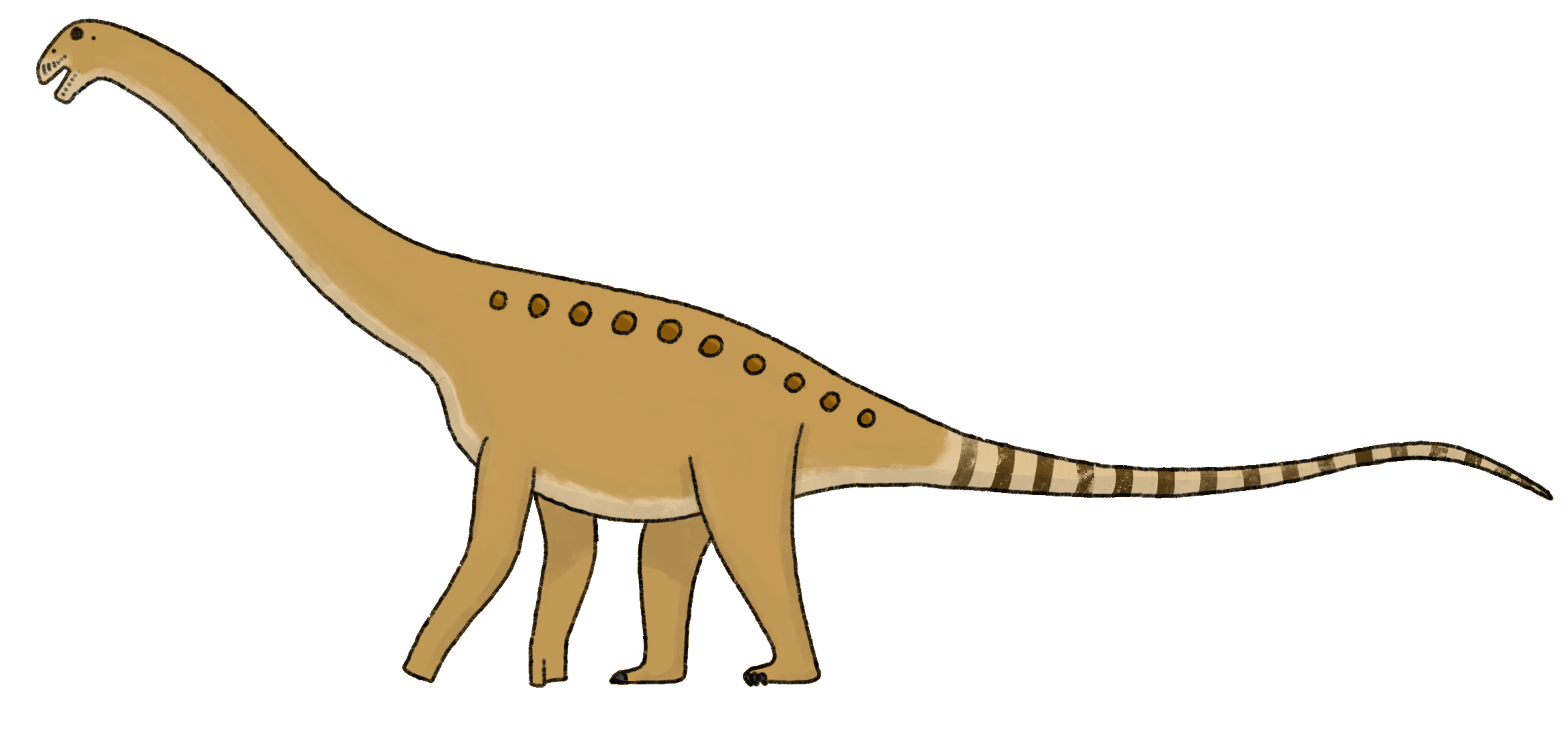
Life restoration

The holotype specimen, MUCPv-1460, is a mostly complete right dentary that was found in rocks of the upper Portezuelo Formation. The dentary is squared-off instead of curved when viewed from above or below, with the teeth crowded into the front of the jaw, making it similar to the jaw of Antarctosaurus, Brasilotitan, and to a lesser extent Bonitasaura. The specimen is currently held at the Geology and Paleontology Museum of the National University of Comahue, Parque Natural Geo-Paleontológico Proyecto Dino, Barreales Lake.
