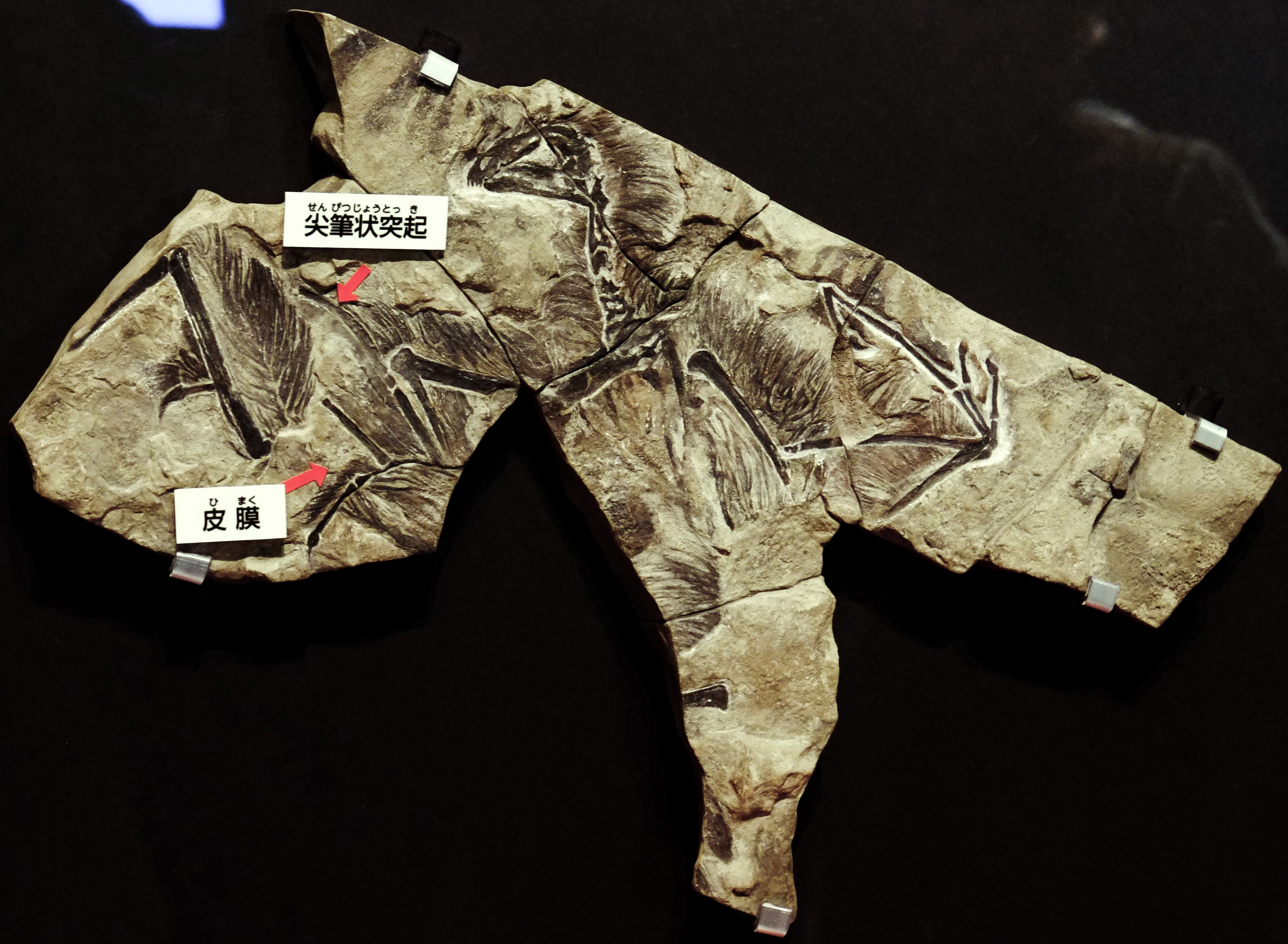
- Replica fossil of Y. qi

Scientific classification
- Kingdom: Animalia
- Phylum: Chordata
- Class: Reptilia
- Clade: Dinosauria
- Clade: Saurischia
- Clade: Theropoda
- Family: †Scansoriopterygidae
- Genus: †Yi; Xu et al., 2015

Type species
- Yi qi Xu et al., 2015

Species
- Y. qi Xu et al., 2015

= Yi (dinosaur) =

Yi Temporal range: Middle–Late Jurassic, 160–157 Ma

Extinct genus of dinosaur

Yi is a genus of scansoriopterygid dinosaur from the Late Jurassic of China. Its only species, Yi qi (Mandarin pronunciation: [î tɕʰǐ]; from Chinese: 翼; pinyin: yì; lit. 'wing' and 奇; qí; 'strange'), is known from a single fossil specimen of an adult individual found in Middle or Late Jurassic Tiaojishan Formation of Hebei, China, approximately 159 million years ago. It was a small, possibly tree-dwelling (arboreal) animal. Like other scansoriopterygids, Yi possessed an unusual, elongated third finger that appears to have helped to support a membranous gliding wing. The wings of Yi qi were supported by a long, bony strut attached to the wrist. This modified wrist bone and membrane-based plane is unique among all known dinosaurs and might have resulted in wings similar in appearance to those of bats.

== Discovery and naming ==
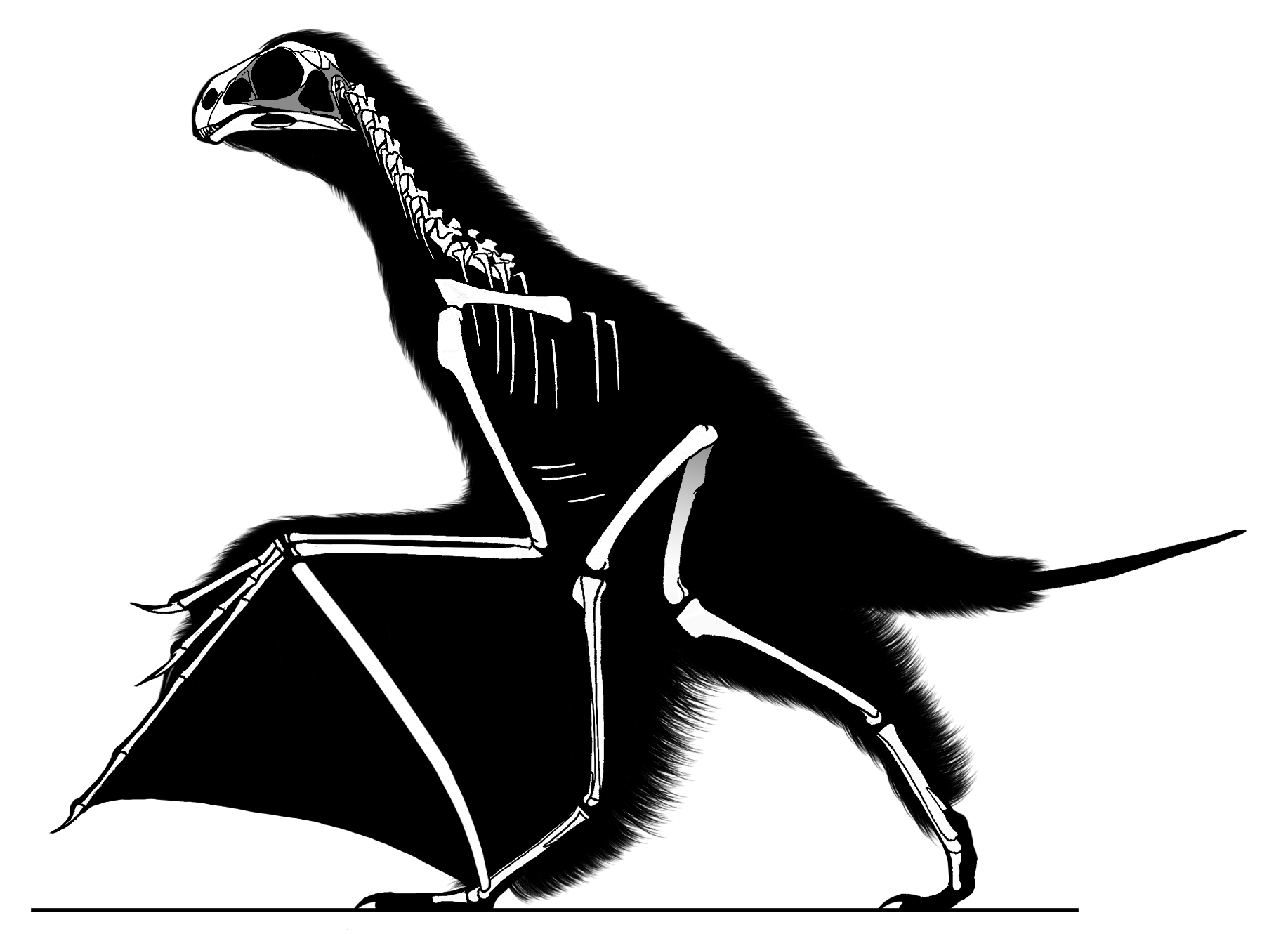
Skeletal diagram showing known elements

The first and only known specimen of Yi qi was a fossil of an adult individual found by a farmer, Wang Jianrong, in a quarry near Mutoudeng Village (Qinglong County, Hebei). Wang sold the fossil to the Shandong Tianyu Museum of Nature in 2007, at which point Ding Xiaoqing, a technician at the museum, began further preparation of the fossil. Because many of the unique features and soft tissues of the specimen were uncovered by museum staff during preparation rather than amateur fossil sellers before the purchase, the scientists who studied it were confident that the specimen was authentic and unaltered, which was confirmed by a CAT scan. The initial study of Yi was published in the journal Nature.

The team of scientists who authored this initial study were led by Xu Xing and also included Zheng Xiaoting, Corwin Sullivan, Wang Xiaoli, Xing Lida, Wang Yan, Zhang Xiaomei, Jingmai O'Connor, Zheng Fucheng Zhang and Pan Yanhong. They named and described the type species Yi qi. The generic name Yi means "wing" in Mandarin. The specific name qi means "strange". Yi is notable for having the shortest generic name of any dinosaur, containing only two letters. Its four-letter binomial name, Yi qi, is also the shortest possible under articles 11.8.1 and 11.9.1 of the International Code of Zoological Nomenclature, and shares this distinction with the great evening bat Ia io.

== Description ==
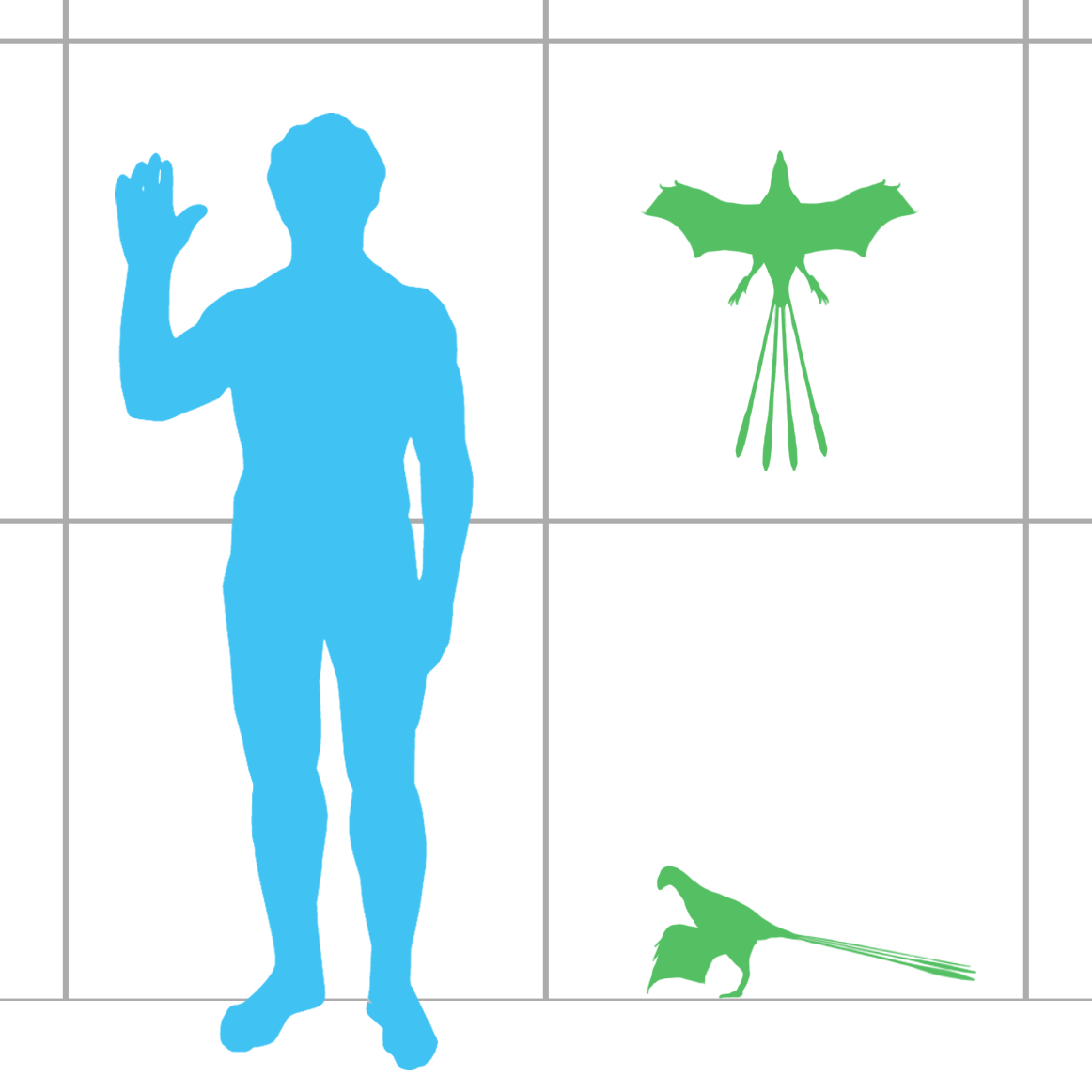
Size of the type specimen compared with a human

Yi qi is known only from a single partial skeleton (holotype specimen STM 31-2) currently in the collections of the Shandong Tianyu Museum of Nature. The fossil was compressed and is visible on a stone plate and a counterplate. It is largely articulated, including the skull, lower jaws, neck, and limb bones, but lacking most of the backbone, pelvis, and tail. Yi was a relatively small animal, estimated to weigh about 380 grams (0.84 lb).

Like other scansoriopterygids, the head was short and blunt-snouted, with a downturned lower jaw. Its few teeth were present only in the tips of the jaws, with the four upper front teeth per side being the largest and slightly forward-pointing, and the front lower teeth being angled even more strongly forward. The long, slender forelimbs were similar, overall, to those of most other paravian dinosaurs. Like other scansoriopterygid dinosaurs, the first finger was shortest and the third was the longest. Unlike all other known dinosaurs, a long, pointed wrist bone known as a "styliform element", exceeding both the third finger and the ulna in length, extended backward from the forelimb bones. This styliform, an adaptation to help support the membrane, may have been a newly evolved wrist bone, or a calcified rod of cartilage. It was slightly curved and tapered at its outer end.

The only known specimen of Yi qi preserved a heavy covering of feathers. Unusually, based on its classification as an advanced theropod in the clade Pennaraptora (a group containing theropods with advanced, bird-like feathers), the feathers were all very simple in structure and "paintbrush-like", with long quill-like bases topped by sprays of thinner filaments. All these structures were rather stiff. The feathers covered most of the body, starting near the tip of the snout. The head and neck feathers were long and formed a thick coat, and the body feathers were even longer and denser, making it difficult for scientists to study their detailed structure. The longest feathers, with a length of about six centimetres, were present behind the upper arm and the shinbone. The metatarsus of the foot had a feather covering also.

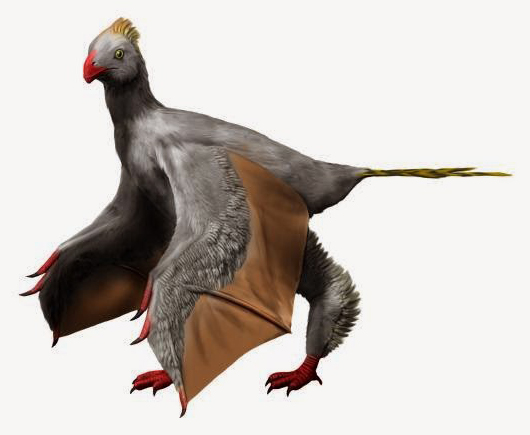
Life restoration

Small patches of wrinkled skin were also preserved, between the fingers and the styliform bone, indicating that unlike all other known dinosaurs, the planes of Yi qi were formed by a skin membrane rather than flight feathers. The membrane stretched between the shorter fingers, the elongated third finger, the styliform bone, and possibly connected to the torso, though the inner part of the wing membrane was not preserved in the only known fossil. This would have given the animal an appearance similar to modern bats, in an example of convergent evolution. However, in bats, the membrane stretches between the fingers only, no styliform wrist bone being present. Ossified styliform bones are found, however, in the wings of some modern gliding animals like flying squirrels. The greater glider, and the prehistoric gliding rodent Eomys quercyi, also have a similarly long cartilaginous styliform element.

On twelve positions the fossil was checked by an electron microscope for the presence of melanosomes, pigment-bearing organelles. All nine feather locations showed eumelanosomes. In the head feathers also phaeomelanosomes were present. On the membranes, only one observation had a positive result, of phaeomelanosomes. The eumelanosomes of the calf feathers were exceptionally large.

== Classification ==
Yi was placed in the Scansoriopterygidae, a group of maniraptoran theropods. A cladistic analysis failed to resolve its exact relationships with the other known scansoriopterygids, Epidendrosaurus and Epidexipteryx. In the analysis the Scansoriopterygidae was recovered as the most basal clade of the Paraves.

== Paleobiology ==
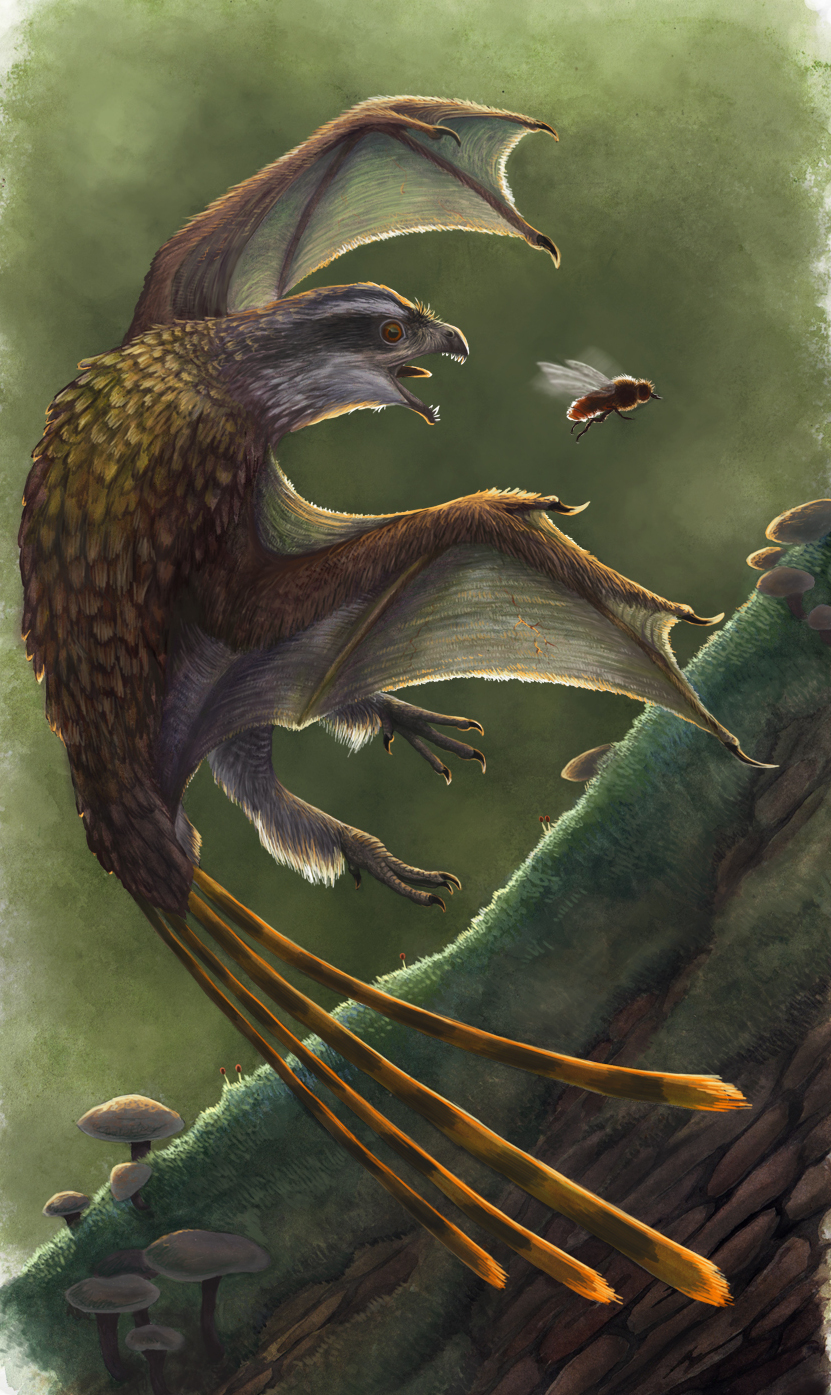
Life restoration by Emily Willoughby

Yi qi, and presumably other scansoriopterygids, possessed a type of wing unknown among any other prehistoric bird relatives. Unlike other paravian dinosaurs, they seem to have replaced bird-like feathers with membranous wings, in what may have been one of many independent evolutionary experiments with flight close to the origin of birds. The membranous wings of Yi qi are unique among dinosaurs and difficult to interpret. That the arm could in principle function as a wing, is shown by being longer than the already elongated hindlimb and the sufficient thickness of its long bones. Also it is hard to explain the styliform element outside a flight context. The presence of a long styliform bone adding support to the membrane, found only in other animals that glide, suggests that Yi qi was specialized for gliding flight. While it is possible that some form of flapping flight was also used by this animal, the lack of evidence for large pectoral muscles—the deltopectoral crest of the humerus being small—and the cumbersome nature of the styliform, make it more likely that Yi qi was an exclusive glider. The only indication of powered flight comes from the researchers who conducted the initial study of the only known Yi specimen, who concluded that its mode of flight should be considered uncertain.

The authors proposed three main models for the wing configuration. In the "bat model", the styliform element would have pointed straight to the rear, a membrane connecting styliform and torso. This would have resulted in a broad wing. A variant of the bat model might be the "pterosaur model" in which the styliform bone would have been directed obliquely to the outside, with a narrower wing as a result. The second main possibility is the "maniraptor model", in which the styliform element was pointing towards the body, reinforcing the trailing edge of a narrow membrane, possibly widened by feathers, on the top or the underside, sticking out. A last configuration would be the "frog model", the styliform bone enlarging a membranous hand plane, like that used by flying frogs. In this last case, no membrane would have formed an inner wing but possibly the arm feathers would have generated some lift.

A preliminary analysis was made of the flight characteristics of the bat model and the maniraptor model. For both models it was assumed that the wingspan was about sixty centimetres (24 in). The narrow wing of the maniraptor model would have resulted in a 320 cm^{2} (50 sq in) wing surface with a wing loading of 1.19 g/cm^{2} (2.4 lb/sq ft). For the broad bat model wing these values would have been 638 cm^{2} (98.9 sq in) and 0.6 g/cm^{2} (1.2 lb/sq ft) respectively. In both cases the wing loading is well below the critical 2.5 g/cm^{2} (25 kg/m^{2}; 5.1 lb/sq ft) upper limit for bird flight. The maniraptor model loading is typical for ducks, though these have a relatively larger wingspan and a lower aspect ratio. The bat model has a loading typical for shore birds, though again their wingspan is (much) larger while their aspect ratio to the contrary is higher. A problem for the hypothesis that Yi was specialised for gliding flight, resides in the fact that because of it having a forelimb wing, instead of a gliding skin along its torso as with most gliders, its center of mass seems to be behind its control and main lift surfaces, causing flight instability. This problem might have been lessened by a short fleshy tail and long tail feathers, as known from its relative Epidexipteryx. Its stability might also have been improved by a few flapping movements of its wings. A modern analogue is the kākāpō, that likewise glides from trees but also flaps to control its descent.

In 2020, T. Alexander Dececchi and colleagues found that, though Yi and other scansoriopterygids were gliding arboreal animals, they had notorious deficiencies in flapping behaviors such as WAIR (Wing-assisted incline running) or taking-off from ground compared to other small paravians, and had similar gliding abilities to those of nearly-sized mammalian gliders, such as bats. Their results suggest that scansoriopterygids might have been specialized maniraptorans in mainly closed forests. While the high glide speed and average glide ratios would have been more efficient for travelling across small gaps in the canopy, longer flights would have been less efficient with higher predation risks. The poor gliding abilities of scansoriopterygids like Yi and Ambopteryx along with their difficulty to take-off, would have made them highly susceptible to be out-competed by more capable aerial vertebrates. Moreover, their likely specialist life-style may have further contributed to this disadvantage.

== Paleoecology ==
The only known Yi qi fossil was found in rocks assigned to the Tiaojishan Formation, dating to the Callovian-Oxfordian age of the Middle-Late Jurassic, dated to approximately 159 million years ago. This is the same formation (and around the same age) as the other known scansoriopterygids Epidexipteryx and Scansoriopteryx. The ecosystem preserved in the Tiaojishan Formation is a forest dominated by bennettitales, ginkgo trees, conifers, and leptosporangiate ferns. These forests surrounded large lakes in the shadow of active volcanoes, ash from which was responsible for the remarkable preservation of many of the fossils. Based on the Tiajishan's plant life, its climate would have been subtropical to temperate, warm and humid. Other vertebrate fossils found in the same rock quarry as Yi qi, which would have been close contemporaries, included salamanders like Chunerpeton tianyiensis, the flying pterosaurs Changchengopterus pani, Dendrorhynchoides mutoudengensis, and Qinglongopterus guoi, dinosaurs like Tianyulong confuciusi, basal birds like Anchiornis huxleyi, Caihong juji, and Eosinopteryx brevipenna, and finally as the early gliding mammaliaform species Arboroharamiya jenkinsi.

== See also ==
- List of short species names
- Evolution of birds
