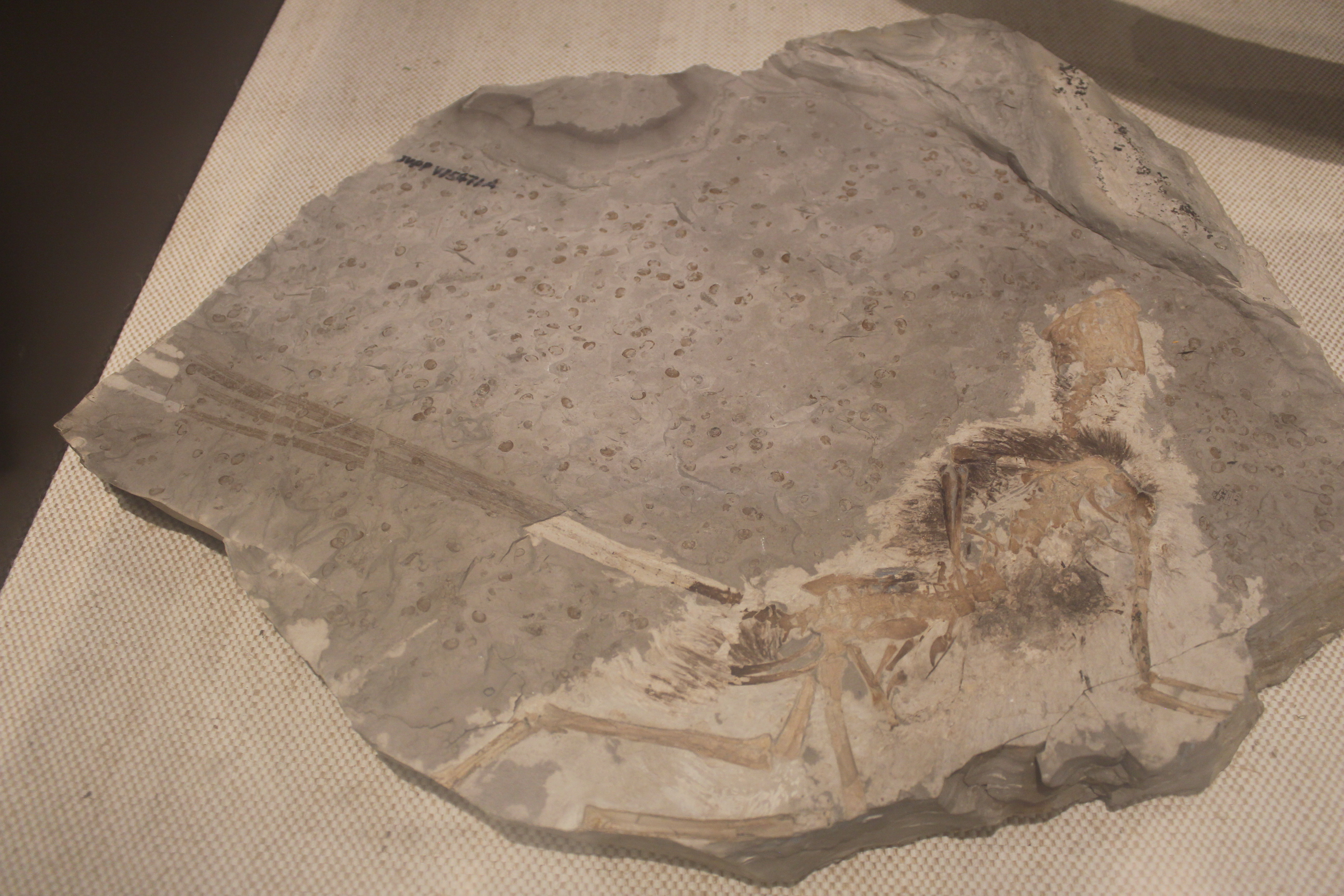
- Holotype fossil, Paleozoological Museum of China

Scientific classification
- Kingdom: Animalia
- Phylum: Chordata
- Class: Reptilia
- Clade: Dinosauria
- Clade: Saurischia
- Clade: Theropoda
- Family: †Scansoriopterygidae
- Genus: †Epidexipteryx; Zhang et al., 2008
- Species: †E. hui

Binomial name
- †Epidexipteryx hui Zhang et al., 2008

= Epidexipteryx =

Epidexipteryx Temporal range: Callovian, 164 Ma

Extinct genus of dinosaurs

Epidexipteryx is a genus of small maniraptoran dinosaurs, known from one fossil specimen in the collection of the Institute of Vertebrate Paleontology and Paleoanthropology in Beijing. Epidexipteryx represents the earliest known example of ornamental feathers in the fossil record.

== Discovery ==
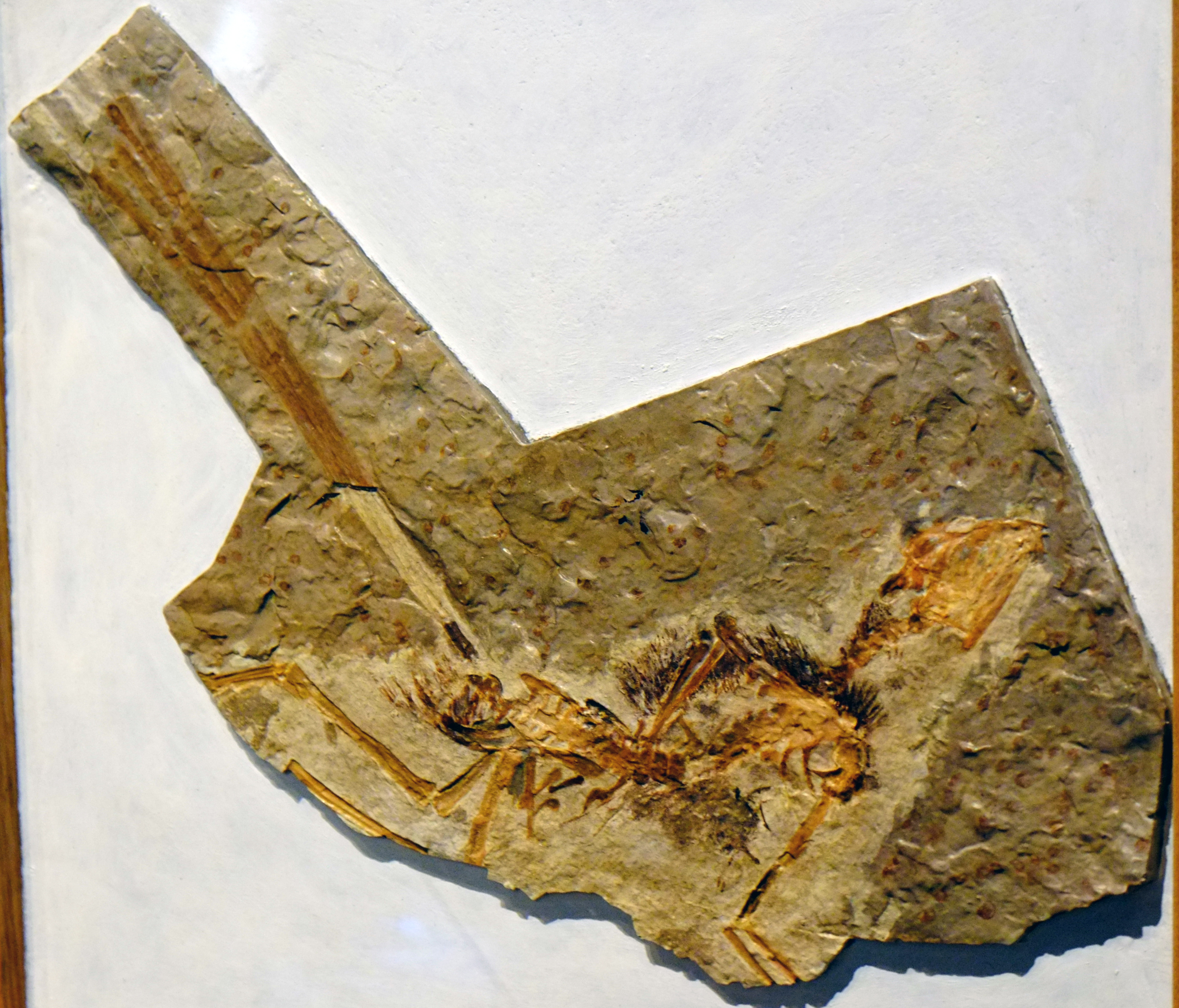
Replica of the holotype in Japan

The type specimen, belonging to a subadult individual, is catalog number IVPP V 15471. The specific name, Epidexipteryx hui ("Hu's display feather"), and its Chinese name Húshì Yàolóng ("Hu Yaoming's display dragon") were coined in memory of paleomammologist Hu Yaoming.

Due to a pre-publication error, a manuscript of the Epidexipteryx hui description first appeared on a preprint Web portal in late September 2008. The paper was officially published in the October 23, 2008 issue of the journal Nature.

== Description ==
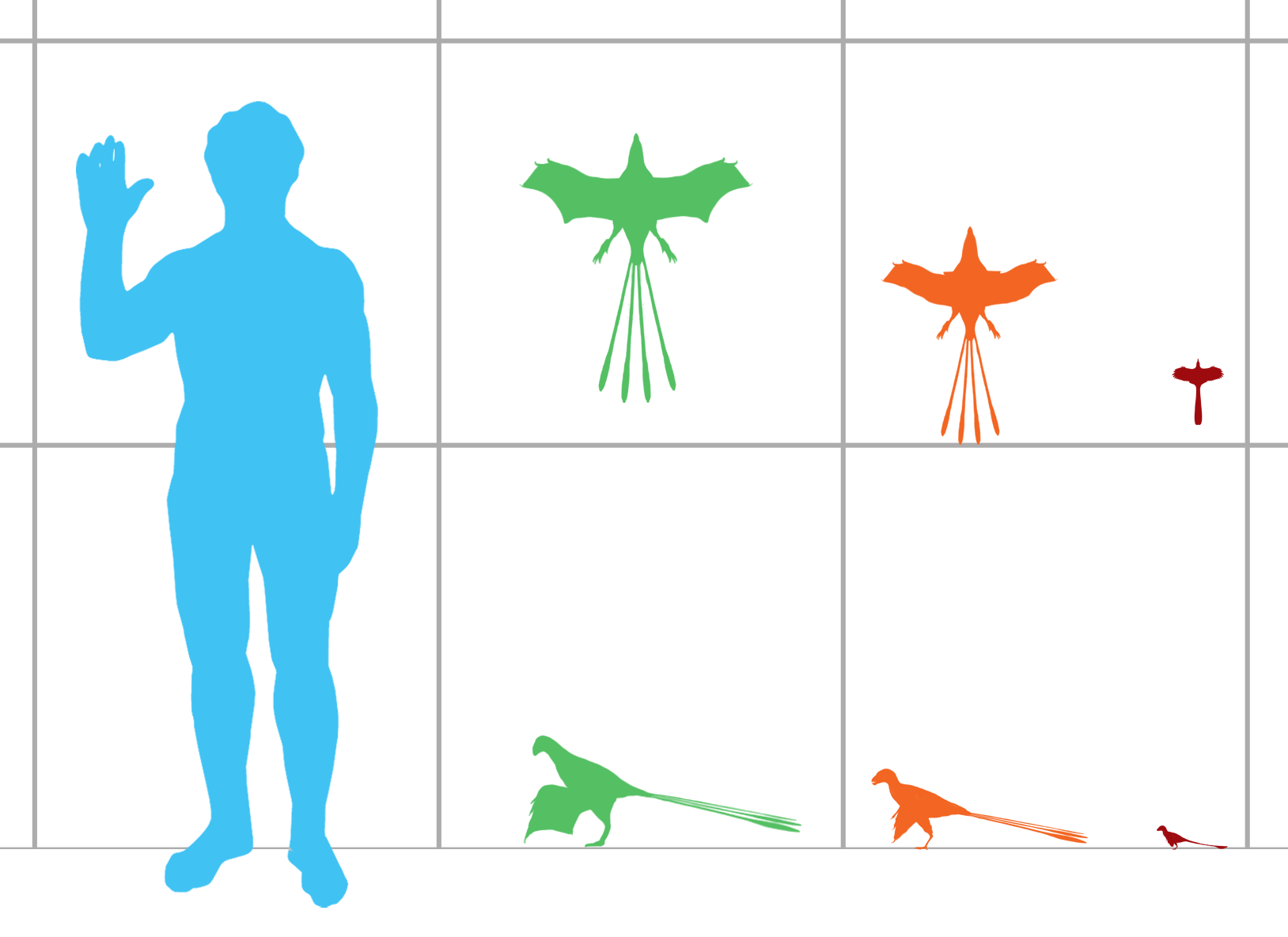
The scansoriopterygid genera Epidexipteryx (orange), Yi (green), and Scansoriopteryx (red) compared to a human in size

E. hui is known from a well-preserved partial skeleton that includes four long feathers on the tail, composed of a central rachis and vanes. However, unlike in modern-style rectrices (tail feathers), the vanes were not branched into individual filaments but made up of a single ribbon-like sheet. Epidexipteryx also preserved a covering of simpler body feathers, composed of parallel barbs as in more primitive feathered dinosaurs. However, the body feathers of Epidexipteryx are unique in that some appear to arise from a "membranous structure" at the base of each feather. It has been suggested that this may represent a stage in the evolution of the feather.

In all, the skeleton of Epidexipteryx hui measures 25 cm (9.8 in) in length (44.5 cm (17.5 in) including the incomplete tail feathers), and the authors estimated a weight of 164 g (5.8 oz), smaller than most other basal avialans. Gregory S. Paul presented a length estimate of 30 cm (12 in) and body mass estimate of 220 g (7.8 oz).

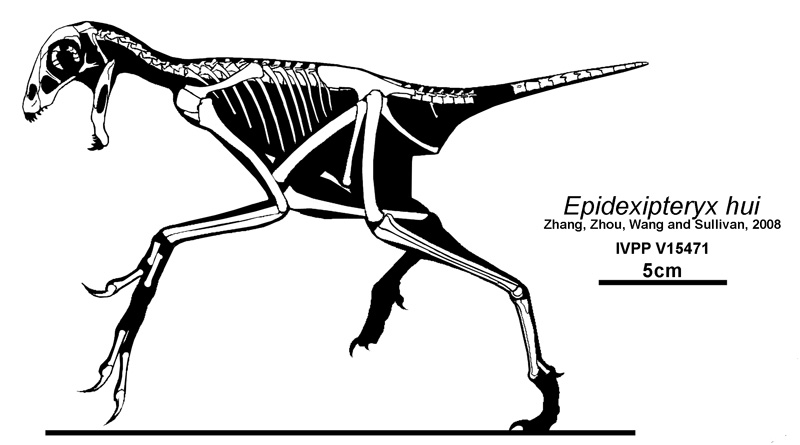
Skeletal diagram showing known elements of the holotype

The skull of Epidexipteryx is also unique in a number of features, and bears an overall similarity to the skull of Sapeornis, oviraptorosaurs and, to a lesser extent, therizinosauroids. It had teeth only in the front of the jaws, with unusually long front teeth angled forward, a feature only seen in Masiakasaurus among other theropods. The rest of the skeleton bore an overall similarity to the possibly closely related Scansoriopteryx, including a hip configuration unusual among other dinosaurs: the pubis was shorter than the ischium, itself expanded towards the tip. The tail of Epidexipteryx also bore unusual vertebrae towards the tip which resembled the feather-anchoring pygostyle of modern birds and some oviraptorosaurs.

== Classification ==
The exact phylogenetic position of Epidexipteryx within Paraves is uncertain. The phylogenetic analysis conducted by the authors of its description recovered it as a member of the family Scansoriopterygidae and as a basal member of the clade Avialae; this was confirmed by the subsequent analysis conducted by Hu et al. (2009). A later analysis conducted by Agnolín and Novas (2011) confirmed it to be a scansoriopterygid, but recovered a different phylogenetic position of this family: Scansoriopterygidae was recovered in polytomy with the family Alvarezsauridae and the clade Eumaniraptora (containing the clades Avialae and Deinonychosauria). Turner, Makovicky and Norell (2012) included Epidexipteryx but not Scansoriopteryx/Epidendrosaurus in their primary phylogenetic analysis, as a full-grown specimen is known only of the former taxon; regarding Scansoriopteryx/Epidendrosaurus, the authors were worried that including it in the primary analysis would be problematic, because it is only known from juvenile specimens, which "do not necessarily preserve all the adult morphology needed to accurately place a taxon phylogenetically" (Turner, Makovicky and Norell 2012, p. 89). Epidexipteryx was recovered as basal paravian that didn't belong to Eumaniraptora. The authors did note that its phylogenetic position is unstable; constraining Epidexipteryx hui as a basal avialan required two additional steps compared to the most parsimonious solution, while constraining it as a basal member of Oviraptorosauria required only one additional step.

Cau (2024) cast doubt on the validity of Epidexipteryx, considering it a junior synonym of the contemporary Epidendrosaurus due to the diagnosis being based on incomplete tail remains within the holotype, the length of the presacral series, which is not fully known in Epidendrosaurus, and the co-ossification of the 10 distalmost cervical centra, which is interpreted as an ontologically variable trait. As such, the Epidexipteryx holotype would represent a more mature individual of Epidendrosaurus.

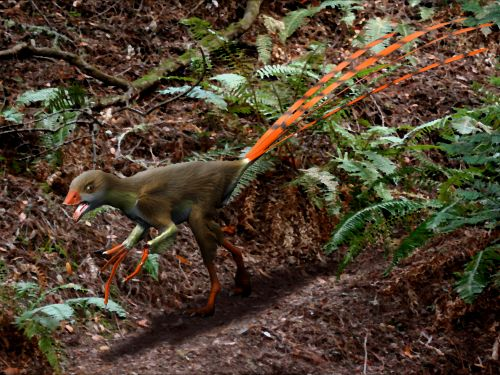
Life restoration showing the animal without arm membranes

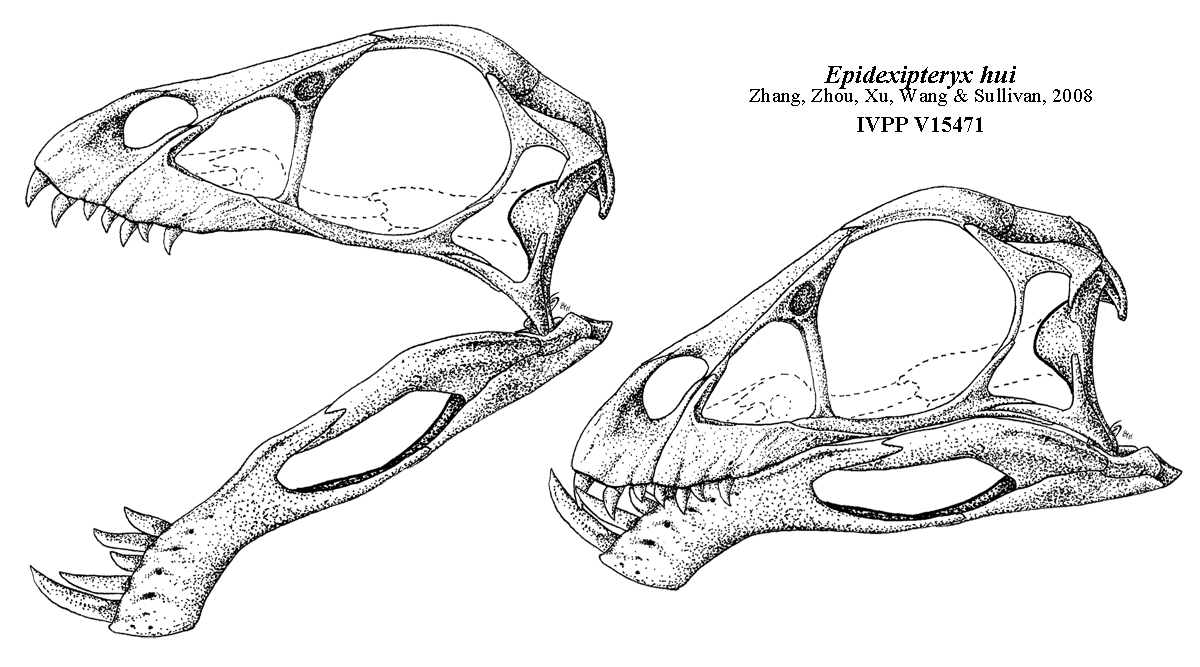
Reconstructions of the skull

A separate exploratory analysis included Scansoriopteryx/Epidendrosaurus, which was recovered as a basal member of Avialae; the authors noted that it did not clade with Epidexipteryx, which stayed outside Eumaniraptora. Constraining the monophyly of Scansoriopterygidae required four additional steps and moved Epidexipteryx into Avialae. A monophyletic Scansoriopterygidae was recovered by Godefroit et al. (2013); the authors found scansoriopterygids to be basalmost members of Paraves and the sister group to the clade containing Avialae and Deinonychosauria. Agnolín and Novas (2013) recovered monophyletic Scansoriopterygidae as well, but found them to be non-paravian maniraptorans and the sister group to Oviraptorosauria.

An abbreviated version of Zhang et al.'s 2008 cladogram is presented below.

- Maniraptora
  - Therizinosauroidea
  - unnamed
    - Alvarezsauridae
    - unnamed
      Oviraptorosauria
    - - unnamed
        - Troodontidae
        - Dromaeosauridae
      - Avialae
        - Scansoriopterygidae
          - Scansoriopteryx (=Epidendrosaurus)
          - Epidexipteryx
        - Aves

== Paleobiology ==
Epidexipteryx appears to have lacked remiges (wing feathers), though based on the related Yi, it may have possessed some sort of membrane wing to allow gliding. In addition it has been compared to an Aye aye using its long claws to rummage through trees in search of grubs to eat.

== Paleoenvironment ==
Epidexipteryx is known from the Middle Jurassic or Upper Jurassic age Daohugou Beds of Inner Mongolia, China (about 160 or 154 mya).
