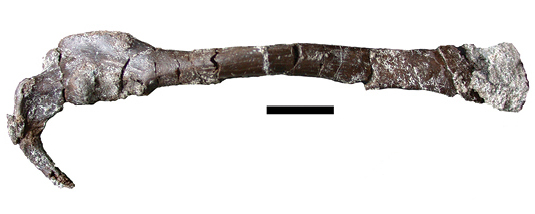
- Holotype left scapulocoracoid

Scientific classification
- Domain: Eukaryota
- Kingdom: Animalia
- Phylum: Chordata
- Clade: Dinosauria
- Clade: Saurischia
- Clade: Theropoda
- Clade: Paraves
- Genus: †Pneumatoraptor; Ősi, Apesteguía & Kowalewski, 2010
- Species: †P. fodori

Binomial name
- †Pneumatoraptor fodori Ősi, Apesteguía & Kowalewski, 2010

= Pneumatoraptor =

Pneumatoraptor Temporal range: Santonian, 85 Ma

Extinct genus of dinosaurs

Pneumatoraptor is a genus of small paravian, possibly a dromaeosaurid, dinosaur that lived in Hungary. It is known from a single complete left shoulder girdle (scapulocoracoid) found in the Csehbánya Formation of the Iharkút locality in the Bakony Mountains of western Hungary. This formation dates to the late Cretaceous period (Santonian age) about 85 million years ago.

The type species is Pneumatoraptor fodori, named for Géza Fodor, who provided funding for the dig. The genus name Pneumatoraptor, which means "air thief", refers to the pneumaticity of the bone, the hollow spaces that would have been filled with air sacs in life. The holotype specimen is identified by the catalog number MTM V.2008.38.1. and housed at the Hungarian Natural History Museum in Budapest.

== Description ==
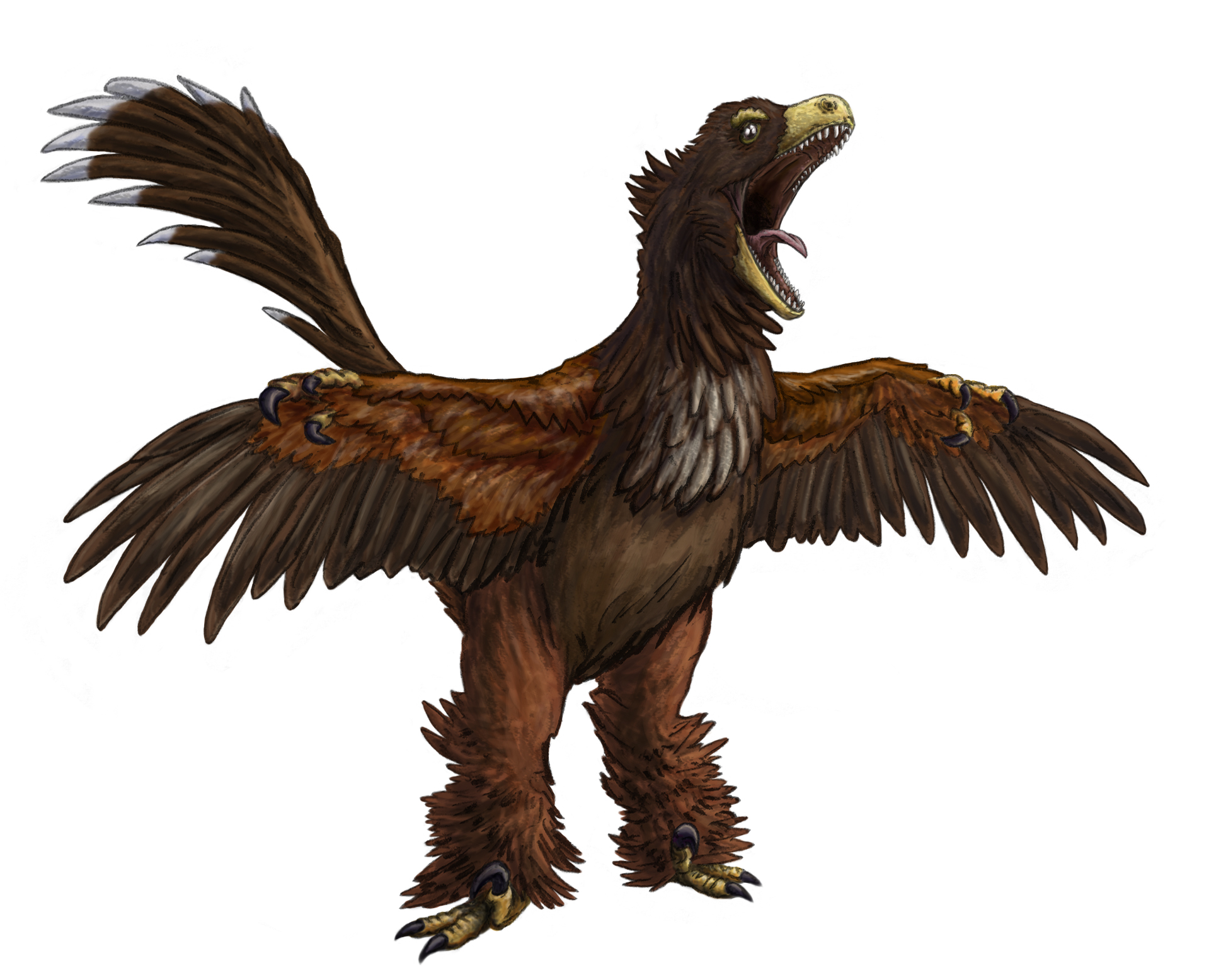
Hypothetical life restoration

Pneumatoraptor differs from other theropods in having a narrow shoulder blade that is nearly circular in cross section, as well as having a large opening in the bone to house a hollow air sac cavity. The bone is small, indicating that the animal was about three times smaller than Velociraptor. The shoulder girdle is L-shaped, showing it to be a member of the group Paraves, which also includes the dromaeosaurids, troodontids, and birds. While the Pneumatoraptor remains are too incomplete to tell which, if any, of these specific groups it belongs to, many of the features of the bones are similar to dromaeosaurids.

Other paravian remains from the same formation may belong to Pneumatoraptor. These include isolated teeth, claws, tail vertebrae, and a partial lower leg bone (tibia).
