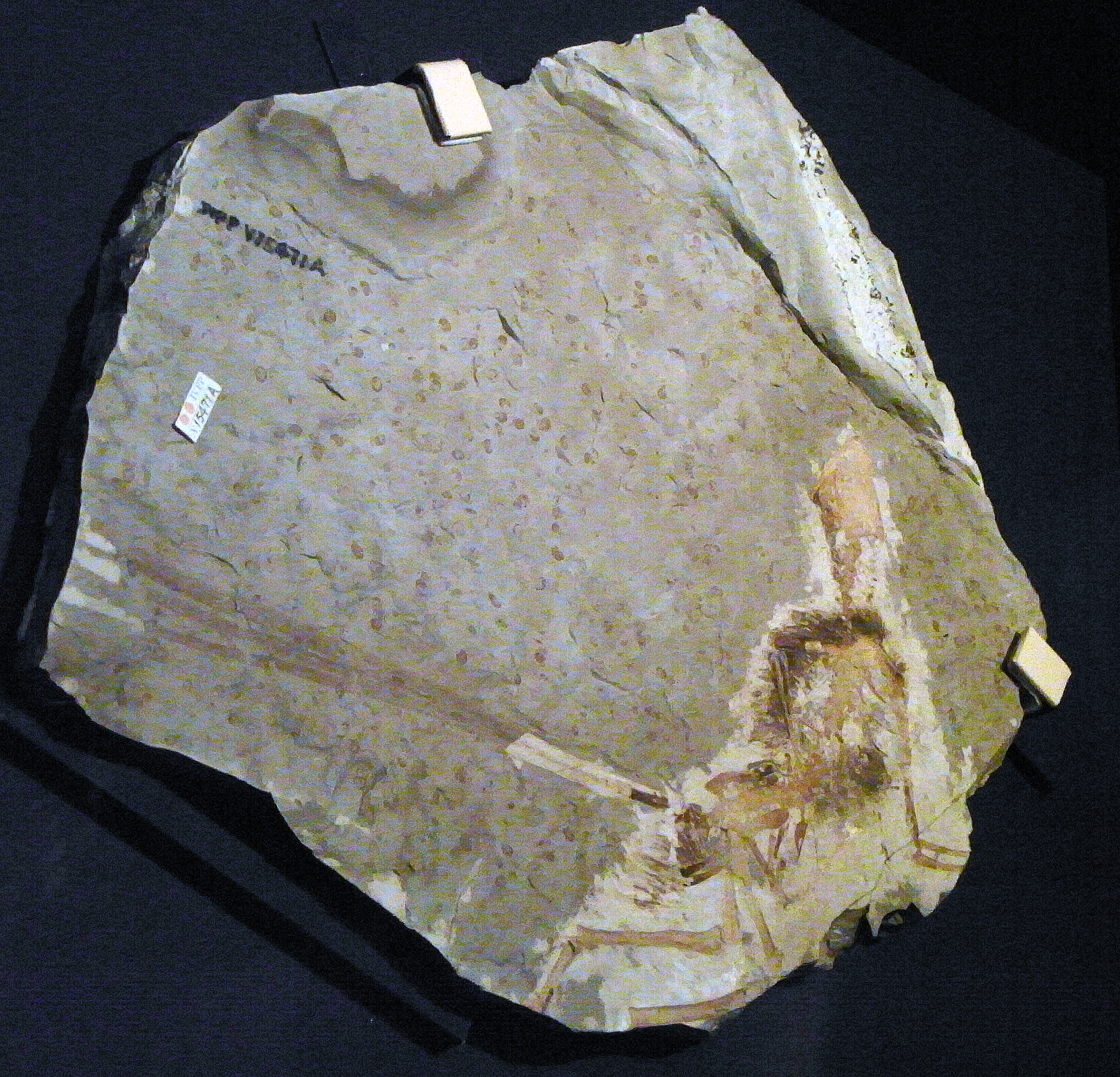
- Fossil specimen of Epidexipteryx hui

Scientific classification
- Kingdom: Animalia
- Phylum: Chordata
- Class: Reptilia
- Clade: Dinosauria
- Clade: Saurischia
- Clade: Theropoda
- Clade: Pennaraptora
- Family: †Scansoriopterygidae; Czerkas & Yuan, 2002

Type species
- †Scansoriopteryx heilmanni Czerkas & Yuan, 2002

Genera
- †Ambopteryx; †Epidexipteryx; †Scansoriopteryx; †Yi

= Scansoriopterygidae =

Scansoriopterygids Temporal range: Middle to Late Jurassic, 165–156 Ma

Extinct family of dinosaurs

Scansoriopterygidae (meaning "climbing wings") is an extinct family of climbing and gliding maniraptoran dinosaurs. Scansoriopterygids are known from five well-preserved fossils, representing four species, unearthed in the Tiaojishan Formation fossil beds (dating to the mid-late Jurassic Period) of Liaoning and Hebei, China.

Scansoriopteryx heilmanni (and its likely synonym Epidendrosaurus ninchengensis) was the first non-avian dinosaur found that had clear adaptations to an arboreal or semi-arboreal lifestyle–it is likely that they spent much of their time in trees. Both specimens showed features indicating they were juveniles, which made it difficult to determine their exact relationship to other non-avian dinosaurs and birds. It was not until the description of Epidexipteryx hui in 2008 that a subadult specimen was known. In 2015, the discovery of an adult specimen belonging to the species Yi qi showed that scansoriopterygids were not only climbers but also had adaptations that could have been used for gliding flight. The recently discovered (in 2019) Ambopteryx also supports this. The earlier described Pedopenna may also be a member of this clade.

== Description ==
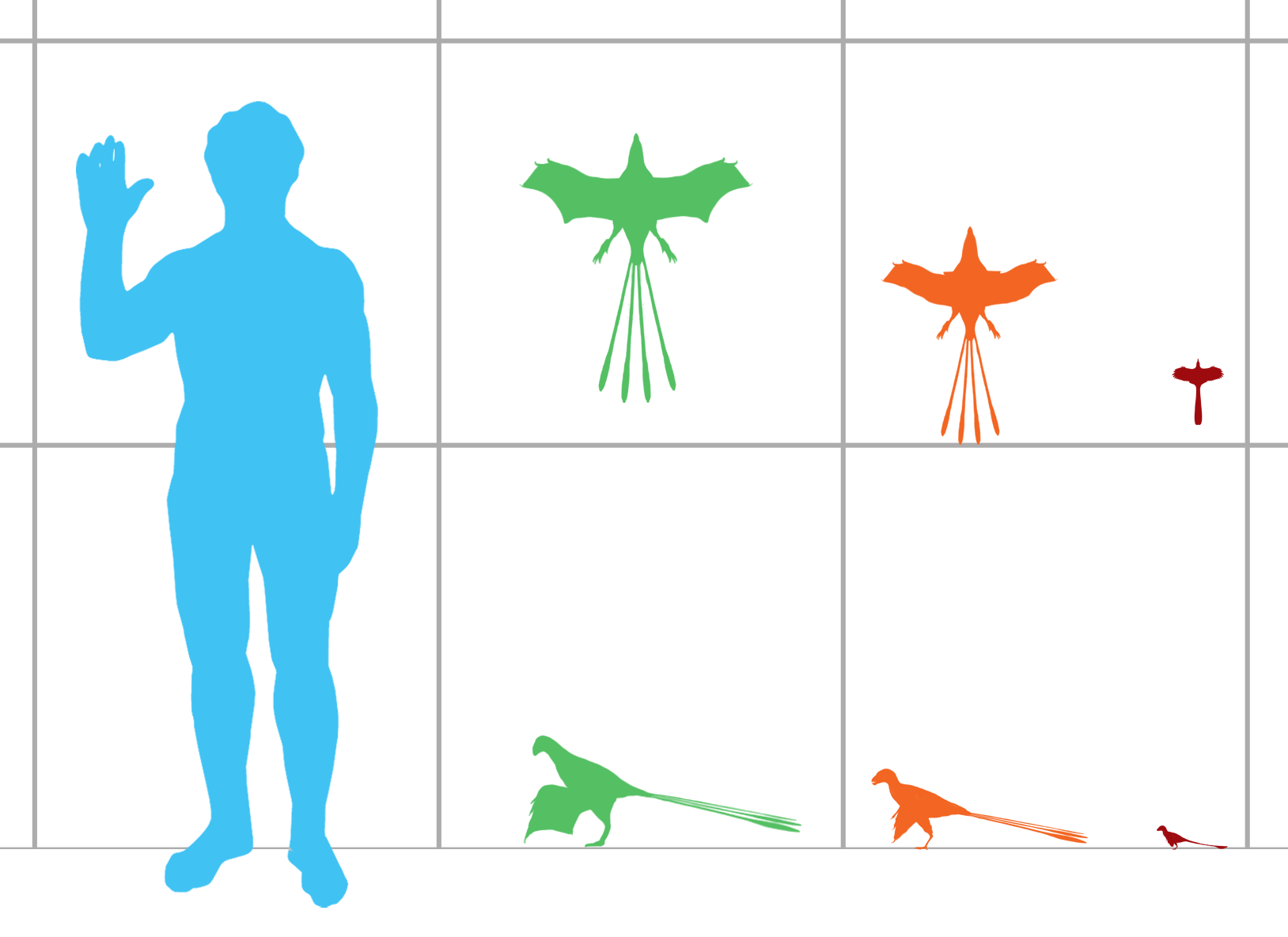
Sizes of Yi qi (green), Epidexipteryx hui (orange), and Scansoriopteryx heilmanni (red) compared with a human.

Scansoriopterygids are among the smallest non-avian dinosaurs known. The juvenile specimens of Scansoriopteryx are the size of house sparrows, about 16 cm (6.3 in) long, while the subadult type specimen of Epidexipteryx is about the size of a pigeon, about 25 cm (9.8 in) long (not including the tail feathers).

Scansoriopterygids differentiate from other theropod dinosaurs in part by their extremely long third fingers, which were longer than the first and second digits of the hand. In all other known theropods, the second finger is the longest. At least two species, Yi and Ambopteryx, also had a long "styliform" bone growing from the wrist, which, along with the third finger, helped support a bat-like wing membrane used for gliding. This use of a long finger to support a wing membrane is only superficially similar to the wing arrangement in pterosaurs, even though it is physically more bat-like.

Other features shared within the group include short and high skulls with down turned lower jaws and large front teeth, and long arms. Tail length, however, varied significantly among scansoriopterygids. Epidexipteryx had a short tail (70% the length of the torso), anchoring long tail feathers, while Scansoriopteryx had a very long tail (over three times as long as the torso) with a short spray of feathers at the tip. All three described scansoripterygid specimens preserve the fossilized traces of feathers covering their bodies.

== Classification ==
Scansoriopterygidae was created as a family-level taxon by Stephen Czerkas and Yuan Chongxi in 2002. Some scientists, such as Paul Sereno, initially considered the concept redundant because the group was originally monotypic, containing only the single genus and species Scansoriopteryx heilmanni. Additionally, the group lacked a phylogenetic definition. However, in 2008 Zhang et al. reported another scansoriopterygid, Epidexipteryx, and defined Scansoriopterygidae as a clade comprising most recent common ancestor of Epidexipteryx and Epidendrosaurus (=Scansoriopteryx) plus all its descendants.

The exact taxonomic placement of this group was initially uncertain and controversial. When describing the first validly published specimen in 2002 (Scansoriopteryx heilmanni), Czerkas and Yuan proposed that various primitive features of the skeleton (including a primitive, "saurischian-style" pubis and primitive hip joint) showed that scansoriopterygids, along with other maniraptorans and birds, split from other theropods very early in dinosaur evolution. However, this interpretation has not been followed by most other researchers. In a 2007 cladistic analysis of relationships among coelurosaurs, Phil Senter found Scansoriopteryx to be a member of the clade Avialae. This view was supported by a second phylogenetic analysis performed by Zhang et al. in 2008.

A subsequent phylogenetic analysis conducted by Agnolín and Novas (2011) recovered scansoriopterygids not as avialans, but as basal members of the clade Paraves remaining in unresolved polytomy with alvarezsaurids and the clade Eumaniraptora (containing avialans and deinonychosaurs).

Turner, Makovicky and Norell (2012) included only Epidexipteryx hui in their primary phylogenetic analysis, as a full-grown specimen of this species is known; regarding Scansoriopteryx/Epidendrosaurus, the authors were worried that including it in the primary analysis would be problematic, because it is only known from juvenile specimens, which "do not necessarily preserve all the adult morphology needed to accurately place a taxon phylogenetically" (Turner, Makovicky and Norell 2012, p. 89). Epidexipteryx was recovered as basal paravian that didn't belong to Eumaniraptora. The authors did note that its phylogenetic position is unstable; constraining Epidexipteryx hui as a basal avialan required two additional steps compared to the most parsimonious solution, while constraining it as a basal member of Oviraptorosauria required only one additional step. A separate exploratory analysis included Scansoriopteryx/Epidendrosaurus, which was recovered as a basal member of Avialae; the authors noted that it did not clade with Epidexipteryx, which stayed outside Eumaniraptora. Constraining the monophyly of Scansoriopterygidae required four additional steps and moved Epidexipteryx into Avialae.

A monophyletic Scansoriopterygidae was recovered by Godefroit et al. (2013); the authors found scansoriopterygids to be basalmost members of Paraves and the sister group to the clade containing Avialae and Deinonychosauria. Agnolín and Novas (2013) recovered scansoriopterygids as non-paravian maniraptorans and the sister group to Oviraptorosauria. Brusatte et al. (2014) also found Epidexipteryx to be a basal oviraptorosaur along with Pedopenna. The Bayesian analysis of Cau (2018) placed scansoriopterygids in Oviraptorosauria again, while the parsimony analysis placed them in the base of Avialae, and included Xiaotingia in Scansoriopterygidae as sister to the rest of the group. Pittman et al. (2020) again found scansoriopterygids to be basal oviraptorosaurs. Cau (2024) placed Scansoriopterygidae within Anchiornithidae.

The cladogram below follows the results of a phylogenetic study by Lefèvre et al., 2014:

- Pennaraptora
  - †Oviraptorosauria
  - Paraves
    - †Scansoriopterygidae
    - Eumaniraptora
      - †Dromaeosauridae
      - Averaptora
        - †Troodontidae
        - - Avialae

Sorkin (2021) argues scansoriopterygids provide evidence that all pennaraptorans evolved from scansorial gliding ancestors.

== Provenance and paleoecology ==
The fossil remains of Epidexipteryx, Scansoriopteryx and Yi were all recovered from the Tiaojishan Formation of northeastern China, and the former two were specifically found in the Daohugou Beds. A study published in 2008 refined the possible age range of this formation, finding that the lower boundary of the Tiaojishan was formed 165 Ma ago, and the upper boundary somewhere between 156 and 153 Ma ago.

The known scansoriopterygids of the Daohugou biota inhabited a humid, temperate forest made up of a variety of prehistoric trees including species of ginkgo and conifer. The understory would have been dominated by plants such as club mosses, horsetails, cycads, and ferns.

The scansoriopterygids would have lived alongside synapsids such as the aquatic Castorocauda, arboreal gliding mammal Volaticotherium and various types of gliding haramiyidans, the rhamphorhynchoid pterosaurs Jeholopterus and Pterorhynchus, as well as a diverse range of insect life (including mayflies and beetles) and several species of salamander.

== Paleobiology ==
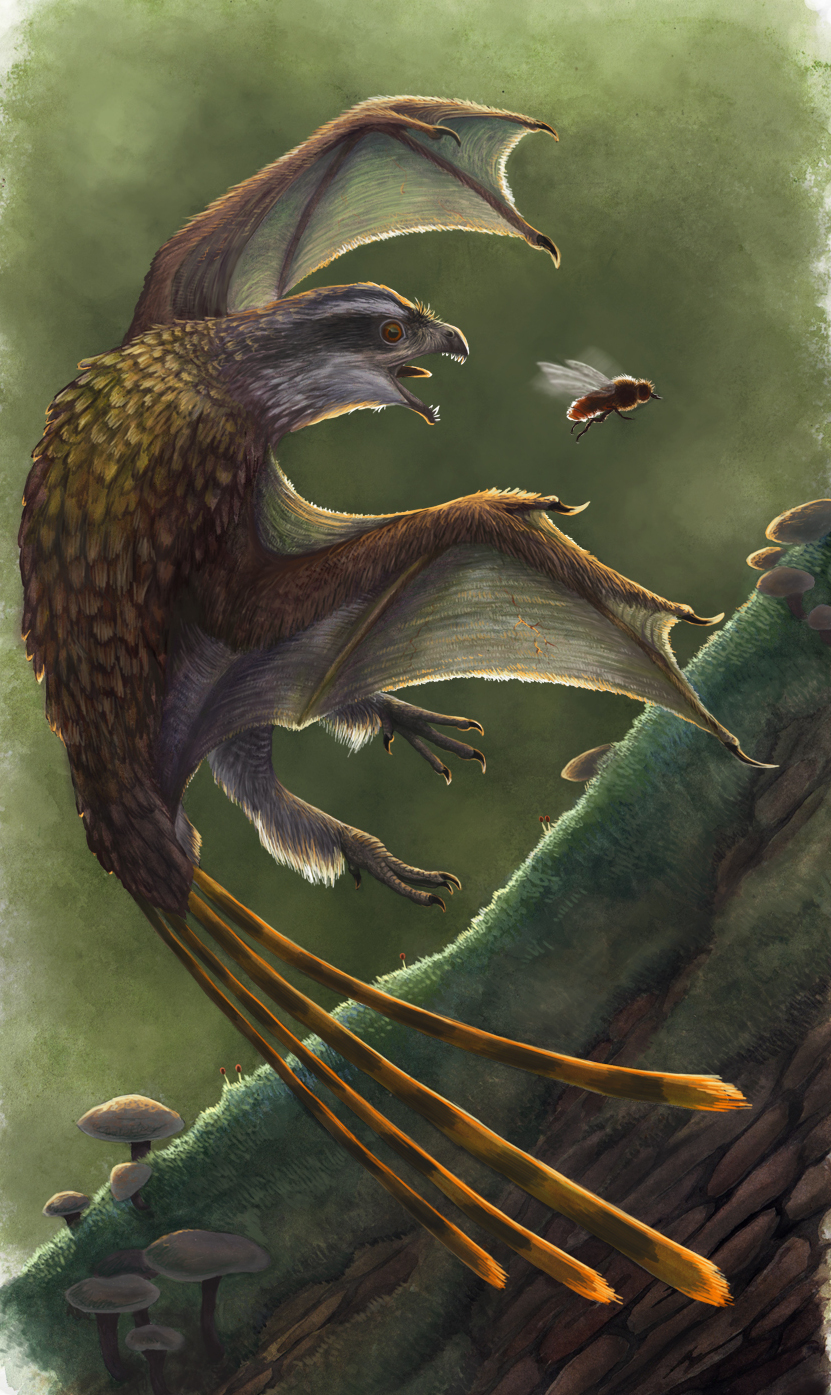
Life restoration of a Yi qi in its environment

=== Climbing ===
In the initial descriptions of the first two scansoriopterygid specimens, scientists studying these animals used several lines of evidence to argue that they were arboreal (tree-climbing), and the first known non-avian dinosaurs with clear climbing adaptations.

Zhang and colleagues considered Scansoriopteryx to be arboreal based on the elongated nature of the hand and specializations of the foot. These authors stated that the long hand and strongly curved claws were adaptations for climbing and moving around among tree branches. They viewed this as an early stage in the evolution of the bird wing, stating that the forelimbs became well-developed for climbing, and that this development later led to the evolution of a wing capable of flight. They argued that long, grasping hands are more suited to climbing than to flight, since most flying birds have relatively short hands. Zhang et al. also noted that the foot of Scansoriopteryx is unique among non-avian theropods; while Scansoriopteryx does not preserve a reversed hallux (the backward-facing toe seen in modern perching birds), its foot was very similar in construction to primitive perching birds like Cathayornis and Longipteryx. These adaptations for grasping ability in all four limbs, the authors argued, makes it likely that Scansoriopteryx spent a significant amount of time living in trees.

In describing Scansoriopteryx, Czerkas and Yuan also described evidence for an arboreal lifestyle. They noted that, unlike all modern bird hatchlings, the forelimbs of Scansoriopteryx are longer than the hind limbs. The authors argued that this anomaly indicates the forelimbs played an important role in locomotion even at an extremely early developmental stage. Scansoriopteryx has a better-preserved foot than the type of Epidendrosaurus, and the authors interpreted the hallux as reversed, the condition of a backward-pointing toe being widespread among modern tree-dwelling birds. Furthermore, the authors pointed to the stiffened tail of Scansoriopteryx as a tree-climbing adaptation. The tail may have been used as a prop, much like the tails of modern woodpeckers. Comparison with the hands of modern climbing species with elongated third digits, like iguanid lizards, also supports the tree-climbing hypothesis. Indeed, the hands of Scansoriopteryx are much better adapted to climbing than the modern tree-climbing hatchling of the hoatzin.

=== Feathers ===
Both juvenile scansoriopterygid specimens preserve impressions of simple, down-like feathers, especially around the hand and arm. The longer feathers in this region led Czerkas and Yuan to speculate that adult scansoriopterygids may have had reasonably well-developed wing feathers which could have aided in leaping or rudimentary gliding, though they ruled out the possibility that Scansoriopteryx could have achieved powered flight. Like other maniraptorans, scansoriopterygids had a semilunate carpal (half-moon shaped wrist bone) that allowed for bird-like folding motion in the hand. Even if powered flight was not possible, this motion could have aided maneuverability in leaping from branch to branch.

The adult specimen of Epidexipteryx lacked preserved feathers around the forelimbs, but preserved simple feathers on the body and long, ribbon-like feathers on the tail. The tail feathers, likely used in display, consisted of a central shaft (rachis) and unbranched vane (unlike the vanes of modern feathers, which are broken up into smaller filaments or barbs).

Yi also preserves feathers. These are notably very simple for a member of Pennaraptora (a clade of which scansoriopterygids are usually considered members), being "paintbrush-like", with long quill-like bases topped by sprays of thinner filaments. The feathers covered most of the body, starting near the tip of the snout. The head and neck feathers were long and formed a thick coat, and the body feathers were even longer and denser, making it difficult for scientists to study their detailed structure.

=== Gliding membranes ===
At least two species, Yi qi and Ambopteryx longibrachium, developed a patagium, supporting it with the elongated third finger as well as a unique styliform wrist bone akin to similar structures in flying squirrels, bats, pterosaurs and anomalures. Though propatagia are known in birds and similar dinosaurs, scansoriopterygids were the only known dinosaurs to develop true membranous wings, most notably so due to the presence of already fairly derived feathers.

Prior to the discovery of Yi, Italian palaeontologist Andrea Cau had informally suggested that membranes may have been present in Scansoriopteryx, supported by its elongated third finger, due to their similarity to the wing fingers of pterosaurs, a hypothesis he later also applied to Epidexipteryx.
