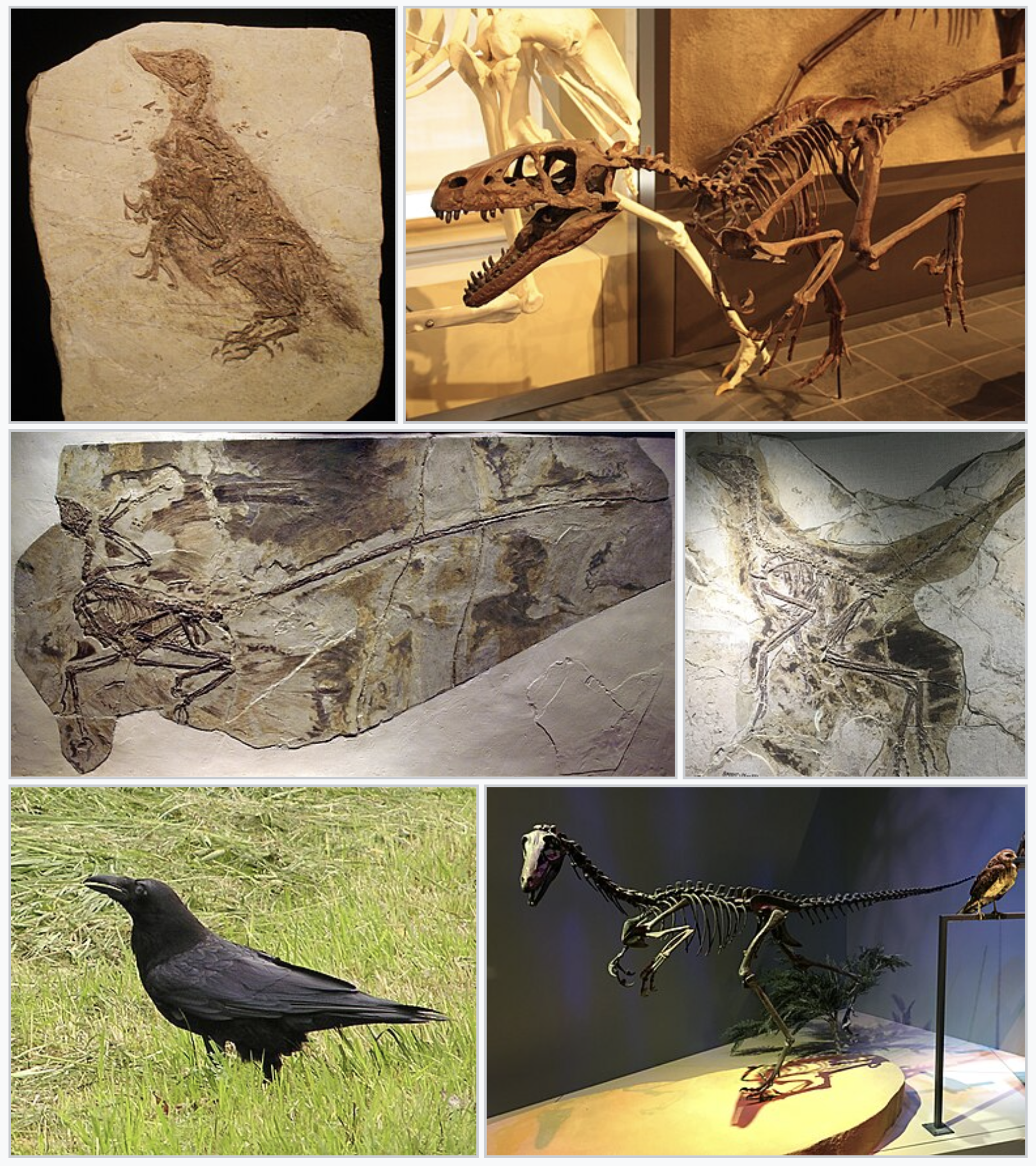
- Six paravian dinosaurs (top left to bottom right): Confuciusornis, Dromaeosaurus, Microraptor, Anchiornis, a crow, and the Prince Creek troodontid

Scientific classification
- Kingdom: Animalia
- Phylum: Chordata
- Class: Reptilia
- Clade: Dinosauria
- Clade: Saurischia
- Clade: Theropoda
- Clade: Pennaraptora
- Clade: Paraves; Sereno, 1997

Subgroups
- †Changzhousaurus; †Imperobator; †Overoraptor?; †Palaeopteryx; †Pneumatoraptor; †Rahonavis; †Anchiornithidae; †Archaeopterygidae; †Dromaeosauridae; †Scansoriopterygidae?; †Troodontidae; †Unenlagiidae?; Avialae

Synonyms
- Eumaniraptora Padian et al. 1999

= Paraves =

Paravians Temporal range: Middle Jurassic–Present, 165–0 Ma

Clade of bird-like dinosaurs

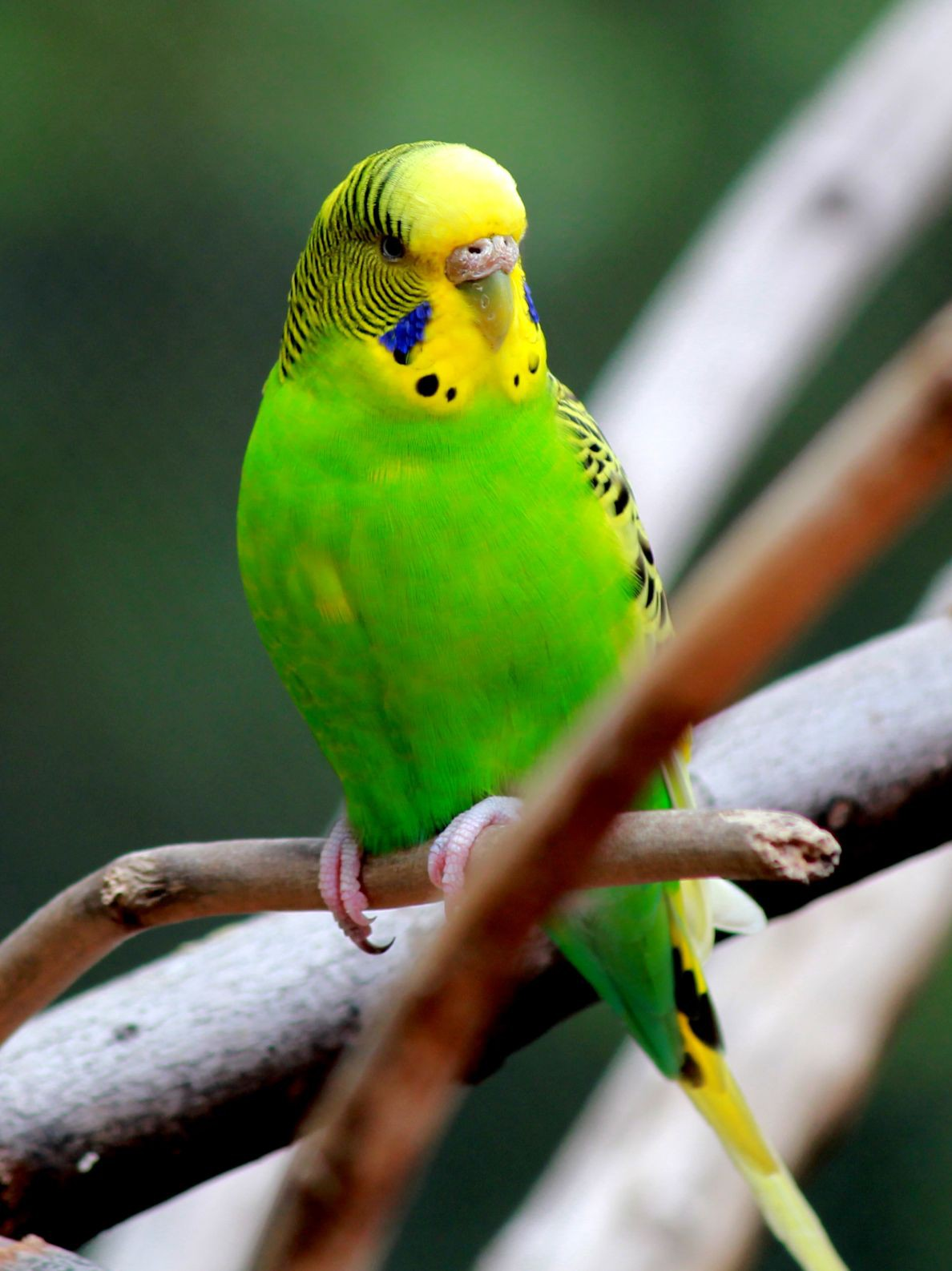
Birds, like this budgerigar, members of the paraves, are the only living dinosaurs.

Paraves are a widespread group of theropod dinosaurs that originated in the Middle Jurassic period. In addition to the extinct dromaeosaurids, troodontids, anchiornithids, and possibly the scansoriopterygids, the group also contains the avialans, which include diverse extinct taxa as well as the over 11,000 species of living birds.

Basal members of Paraves are well known for the possession of an enlarged claw on the second digit of the foot, which was held off the ground when walking in some species. A number of differing scientific interpretations of the relationships between paravian taxa exist. New fossil discoveries and analyses make the classification of Paraves an active subject of research.

== Description ==
Like other theropods, all paravians are bipedal, walking on their two hind legs.

The teeth of basal paravians were curved and serrated, but not blade-like except in some specialized species, such as Dromaeosaurus albertensis. The serrations on the front edge of dromaeosaurid and troodontid teeth were very small and fine, while the back edge had serrations which were very large and hooked.

Most of the earliest paravian groups were carnivorous, though some smaller species (especially among the troodontids and early avialans) are known to have been omnivores, and it has been suggested that an omnivorous diet was the ancestral state for this group, with strict carnivory evolving in some specialized lineages. Fossils also suggest that legs and feet covered with feathers was an ancestral condition, possibly having originated in the Coelurosauria, even if this trait was later lost in more advanced birds.

=== Colored eggs ===
A 2018 study of fossil eggshells using Raman microspectroscopy found preserved egg-colour pigments in all sampled eumaniraptorans, including evidence that non-avian eumaniraptoran eggs were spotted or speckled. The authors concluded that egg colour had a single evolutionary origin, and is a synapomorphy of the Eumaniraptorans.

=== Wings ===
Paravians generally have long, winged forelimbs, though these have become smaller in many flightless species and some extinct lineages that evolved before flight. The wings usually bore three large, flexible, clawed fingers in early forms. The fingers became fused and stiffened and the claws highly reduced or lost in some advanced lineages. An increasingly asymmetric wrist joint, a trend that can be traced back to primitive coelurosaurs, allowed the forelimbs to elongate and an elaboration of their plumage, traits that made the evolution of flapping flight possible.

Many early members of Paraves had both well-developed wings and long feathers on the hind legs, which in some cases, formed a second set of airfoils. These species, most famously represented by Microraptor gui, have often been referred to as "four winged dinosaurs". Though it has been suggested that these hind wings would have prevented some paravians from getting around on the ground, and that they must have lived in trees, there is very little evidence that any of the earliest paravians were capable of climbing. This apparent paradox was addressed by later studies which showed that early paravians like Microraptor were capable of flapping flight and powered launching from the ground into the air without relying on climbing. Microraptor in particular also seems to represent a case of flight evolving independently of the bird lineage within Paraves.

=== Feet and sickle claw ===
Most theropods walked with three toes contacting the ground, but fossilized footprint tracks confirm that many basal paravians, including dromaeosaurids, troodontids, and some early avialans, held the second toe off the ground in a hyperextended position, with only the third and fourth toes bearing the weight of the animal. This is called functional didactyly. The enlarged second toe bore an unusually large, curved sickle-shaped claw (held off the ground or 'retracted' when walking). This claw was especially large and flattened from side to side in the large-bodied predatory eudromaeosaurs. In these early species, the first toe (hallux) was usually small and angled inward toward the center of the body, but only became fully reversed in more specialized members of the bird lineage. One species, Balaur bondoc, possessed a first toe which was highly modified in parallel with the second. Both the first and second toes on each foot of B. bondoc were held retracted and bore enlarged, sickle-shaped claws. One of the best-known features of paravians is the presence of an enlarged and strongly curved "sickle claw" on a hyper-extendible second toe, modified to hold the sickle claw clear of the ground when walking, most notably developed in the dromaeosaurids and troodontids. While this characteristic claw and its associated modifications to the anatomy of the foot (such as a shortened metatarsus in eudromaeosaurs) had been known since the mid-20th century, their possible functions were the subject mainly of speculation, and few actual studies were published. Initial speculation regarded the claws as slashing implements used to disembowel large prey. In this scenario, the shortened upper foot would serve as an anchor point for powerful tendons to improve kicking ability. However, subsequent studies of the actual claw shape showed that the underside of the claw was only weakly keeled and would not have been an effective cutting instrument. Instead, it appeared to be more of a hooking implement. Manning et al. suggested in 2006 that the claws were similar to crampons and were used for climbing, and in the case of larger species or individuals, climbing up the flanks of very large prey.

A larger study of sickle-claw function, published in 2011 by Fowler and colleagues, concluded that the earlier study by Manning and colleagues was correct and that the "sickle claws" would have been ineffective as cutting weapons. They compared the claw and overall foot anatomy of various primitive species with modern birds to shed light on their actual function. Fowler and colleagues showed that many modern predatory birds also have enlarged claws on the second toes. In modern raptors, these claws are used to help grip and hold prey of sizes smaller than or equal to the predator, while the birds use their body weight to pin their prey to the ground and eat it alive. Fowler and colleagues suggested that this behavior is entirely consistent with the anatomy of advanced dromaeosaurids like Deinonychus, which had slightly opposing first toes and strong tendons in the toes and foot. This makes it likely that advanced dromaeosaurids also used their claws to puncture and grip their prey to aid in pinning it to the ground, while using shallow wing beats and tail movements to stabilize themselves. Other lines of evidence for this behavior include teeth which had large, hooked serrations only on the back edge (useful in pulling flesh upward rather than slicing it) and large claws on the wings (for greater maneuvering of prey while mantling it with the wings).

In more primitive dromaeosaurids and in troodontids, the feet were not as specialized and the claws were not as large or as hooked. Additionally, the toe joints allowed more range of motion than the simple up-down movements of advanced dromaeosaurids. This makes it likely that these species specialized in smaller prey that could be pinned using only the inner toes, not requiring the feet to be as strong or sturdy.

=== Dichotomy in body sizes ===
Extreme examples of miniaturization and progenesis are found in Paraves. The ancestors of Paraves first started to shrink in size in the early Jurassic 200 million years ago, and fossil evidence shows that this theropod line evolved new adaptations four times faster than other groups of dinosaurs, and was shrinking 160 times faster than other dinosaur lineages were growing. Turner et al. (2007) suggested that extreme miniaturization was ancestral for the clade, whose common ancestor has been estimated to have been around 65 centimetres (26 in) long and 600–700 grams (21–25 oz) in mass. In Eumaniraptora, both Dromaeosauridae and Troodontidae went later through four independent events of gigantism, three times in dromaeosaurids and once in troodontids, while the body mass continued to decrease in many forms within Avialae. Fossils show that all the earliest members of Paraves found to date started out as small, while Troodontidae and Dromaeosauridae gradually increased in size during the Cretaceous period.

== Evolution ==
=== Relationships ===
- Pennaraptora
  - †Oviraptorosauria
  - Paraves
    - - †Scansoriopterygidae
      - - †Xiaotingia
        - †Yixianosaurus
    - - - - †Pedopenna
          - †Aurornis
        - - †Serikornis
          - †Eosinopteryx
      - - †Anchiornis
        - Eumaniraptora
          - - †Troodontidae
            - †Dromaeosauridae
          - Avialae

Cladogram following the results of a phylogenetic study by Lefèvre, Cau, Cincotta, et al. (2017)

- Pennaraptora
  - †Oviraptorosauria
  - Paraves
    - †Dromaeosauridae
    - Averaptora
      - †Troodontidae
      - - †Anchiornithinae
        - Avialae
          - †Archaeopteryx
          - - †Scansoriopterygidae
            - - †Rahonavis
              - Pygostylia

Cladogram following the results of a phylogenetic study by Cau, Beyrand, Voeten et al. (2017)

Paraves is a branch-based clade defined to include all dinosaurs which are more closely related to birds than to oviraptorosaurs. The ancestral paravian is the earliest common ancestor of birds, dromaeosaurids, and troodontids which was not also ancestral to oviraptorosaurs. Paraves often comprises three major sub-groups: Avialae, including Archaeopteryx and modern birds, as well as the dromaeosaurids and troodontids, which may or may not form a natural group.

The name 'Paraves' (Greek pará, par' 'beside, near' + Latin aves, plural of avis 'bird') was coined by Sereno in 1997. The clade was defined by Sereno in 1998 as a branch-based clade containing all Maniraptora closer to Neornithes (which includes all the birds living in the world today) than to Oviraptor.

A node-based clade called Eumaniraptora ("true maniraptorans") was named by Padian, Hutchinson, & Holtz (1997). They defined their clade to include only avialans and deinonychosaurs. Paraves and Eumaniraptora are generally considered to be synonyms, though some phylogenetic studies suggest that the two groups have a similar but not identical content; Agnolín and Novas (2011) recovered scansoriopterygids and alvarezsaurids as paravians that were not eumaniraptorans, while Turner, Makovicky, and Norell (2012) recovered Epidexipteryx as the only known non-eumaniraptoran paravian.

Since the 1960s, the dromaeosaurids and troodontids have often been classified together in a group or clade named the Deinonychosauria, initially based primarily on the presence of a retractable second toe with sickle-claw (now also known to be present in some avialans). The name Deinonychosauria was coined by Ned Colbert and Dale Russell in 1969, and defined as a clade (all theropods closer to dromaeosaurids than to birds) by Jacques Gauthier in 1986.

However, several more recent studies have cast doubt on the hypothesis that dromaeosaurids and troodontids were more closely related to each other than either was to birds, instead finding that troodontids were more closely related to birds than to dromaeosaurids. Because Deinonychosauria was originally defined as all animals closer to dromaeosaurids than to birds without specific reference to troodontids, this would render Deinonychosauria a synonym of Dromaeosauridae. The clade containing avialans, microraptorians, unenlagiids, Anchiornis, and Xiaotingia to the exclusion of Eudromaeosauria was named Averaptora by Agnolín and Novas (2013), defined as all animals closer to Passer than to Dromaeosaurus. Most studies use a similar definition for Avialae, which Agnolín and Novas redefine as the least inclusive clade including Archaeopteryx and modern birds. Averaptora additionally contains troodontids according to Cau, Beyrand, Voeten et al. (2017) and other phylogenies in which find Eudromaeosauria to be an outgroup to a clade including Troodontidae and Avialae.

In 2015 Chatterjee created Tetrapterygidae in the second edition of his book The Rise of Birds: 225 Million Years of Evolution, where he included Microraptor, Xiaotingia, Aurornis, and Anchiornis; together they were proposed to be the sister group of the Avialae. Paraves, Eumaniraptora, and Averaptora are often considered to be synonyms, depending on the interpretation of paravian systematics. Deinonychosauria will become a synonym of Dromaeosauridae when troodontids are found to form a clade with Avialae, to the exclusion of Dromaeosauridae. Tetrapterygidae is a polyphyletic grouping of four-winged basal paravian genera.

=== Origin and early evolution ===
Paravians diverged from other maniraptorans around 165 Mya. Then, around 110–90 Mya, the ancestors of Neornithes (modern birds) split from the other paravians.

Other than the crown group of modern birds, which are direct descendants in the stem lineage of Paraves, there are no extant survivors or genetic material, so their entire phylogeny is inferred only from the fossil record. The prototypical fossil is Archaeopteryx, of which 11 specimens have been found, both complete and partial.

== See also ==
- Origin of birds
- Origin of avian flight
- Evolution of birds
- Biogeography of paravian dinosaurs
- The thecodont hypothesis of bird origins
- Proavis, a hypothetical dinosaur-bird intermediary
- Temporal paradox (paleontology)
- List of fossil bird genera
- Protoavis texensis, a putative but possibly chimeric Triassic bird
