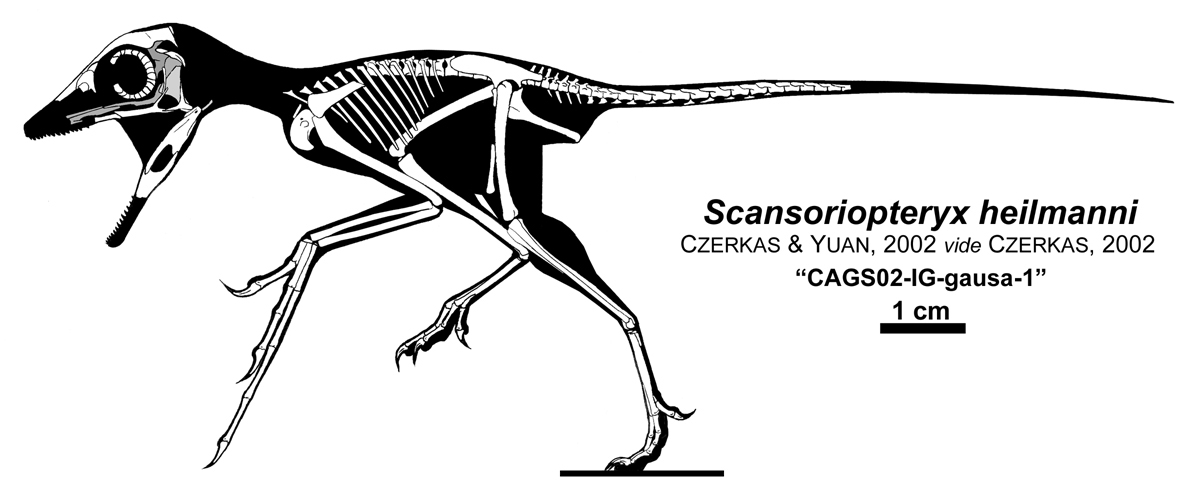
- Skeletal restoration of the type specimen

Scientific classification
- Kingdom: Animalia
- Phylum: Chordata
- Class: Reptilia
- Clade: Dinosauria
- Clade: Saurischia
- Clade: Theropoda
- Family: †Scansoriopterygidae
- Genus: †Scansoriopteryx; Czerkas & Yuan, 2002
- Species: †S. heilmanni

Binomial name
- †Scansoriopteryx heilmanni Czerkas & Yuan, 2002

Synonyms
- Epidendrosaurus ninchengensis Zhang et al., 2002

= Scansoriopteryx =

Scansoriopteryx Temporal range: Callovian to Oxfordian, 165–156 Ma

Extinct genus of dinosaurs

Scansoriopteryx ("climbing wing") is a genus of maniraptoran dinosaur. Described from only a single juvenile fossil specimen found in Liaoning, China, Scansoriopteryx is a sparrow-sized animal that shows adaptations in the foot indicating an arboreal (tree-dwelling) lifestyle. It possessed an unusual, elongated third finger which may have supported a membranous wing, much like the related Yi qi. The type specimen of Scansoriopteryx also contains the fossilized impression of feathers.

Most researchers regard this genus as a synonym of Epidendrosaurus, with some preferring to treat Scansoriopteryx as the junior synonym, though it was the first name to be validly published.

== History ==
The provenance of the Scansoriopteryx type specimen is uncertain, as it was obtained from private fossil dealers who did not record exact geologic data. Czerkas and Yuan initially reported that it had likely come from the Yixian Formation, though Wang et al. (2006), in their study of the age of the Daohugou Beds, suggested that it probably hails from the same beds, and thus is likely a synonym of Epidendrosaurus. The Daohugou Beds supposedly date to the mid-late Jurassic Period, but this is hotly contested. See the Daohugou Beds article for details.

The type specimen of Scansoriopteryx (type genus of the Scansoriopterygidae) and its arboreal adaptations were first presented in 2000 during the Florida Symposium on Dinosaur/Bird Evolution, at the Graves Museum of Archaeology & Natural History, though the specimen would not be formally described and named until 2002.

== Description ==
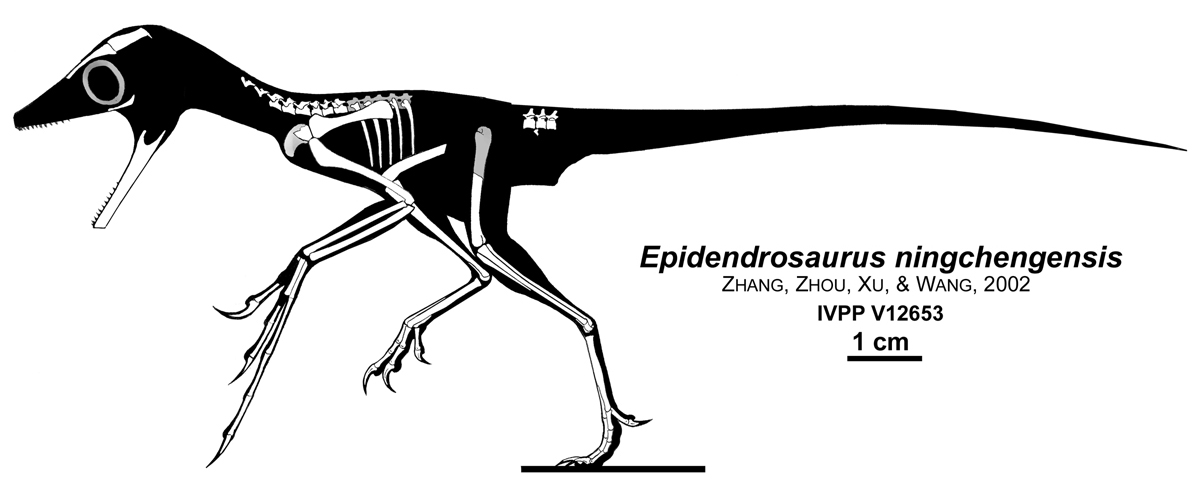
Restoration of the "Epidendrosaurus" specimen

The type specimen of Scansoriopteryx heilmanni (specimen number CAGS02-IG-gausa-1/DM 607) represents the fossilized remains of a hatchling maniraptoran dinosaur, similar in some ways to Archaeopteryx. A second specimen, the holotype of Epidendrosaurus ninchengensis (IVPP V12653), also shows features indicating it was a juvenile. The specimen is partially disarticulated, and most bones are preserved as impressions in the rock slab, rather than three-dimensional structures. Because the only known specimens are juvenile, the size of a full-grown Scansoriopteryx is unknown; the type specimen is a tiny, sparrow-sized creature.

Scansoriopteryx is also notable for its wide, rounded jaws. The lower jaw contained at least twelve teeth, larger in the front of the jaws than in the back. The lower jaw bones may have been fused together, a feature otherwise known only in the oviraptorosaurs.

One distinctive feature of Scansoriopteryx is its elongated third finger, which is the longest on the hand, nearly twice as long as the second finger. This is unlike the configuration seen in most other theropods, where the second finger is longest. The long wing feathers, or remiges, appear to attach to this long digit instead of the middle digit as in birds and other maniraptorans. Shorter feathers are preserved attached to the second finger. A relative of Scansoriopteryx, Yi, suggests that this elongated third finger supported a membranous wing of some kind alongside feathers.

Scansoriopteryx had a non-perforated hip socket, which is more open in most, but not all, other dinosaurs. It also had a pubis (hip bone) which pointed forward, a primitive trait among theropods, and unlike some maniraptorans more closely related to birds, where the pubis points downward or backward. The legs were short, and preserve small pebbly scales along the upper foot (metatarsus), as well as possible impressions of long feathers in the same area, possibly similar to the "hind wings" of Microraptor and other basal paravians. It also had an unusually large first toe, or hallux, which was low on the foot and may have been reversed, allowing some grasping ability.

The tail was long, six or seven times the length of the femur, and ended in a fan of feathers.

== Paleobiology ==
=== Climbing ===
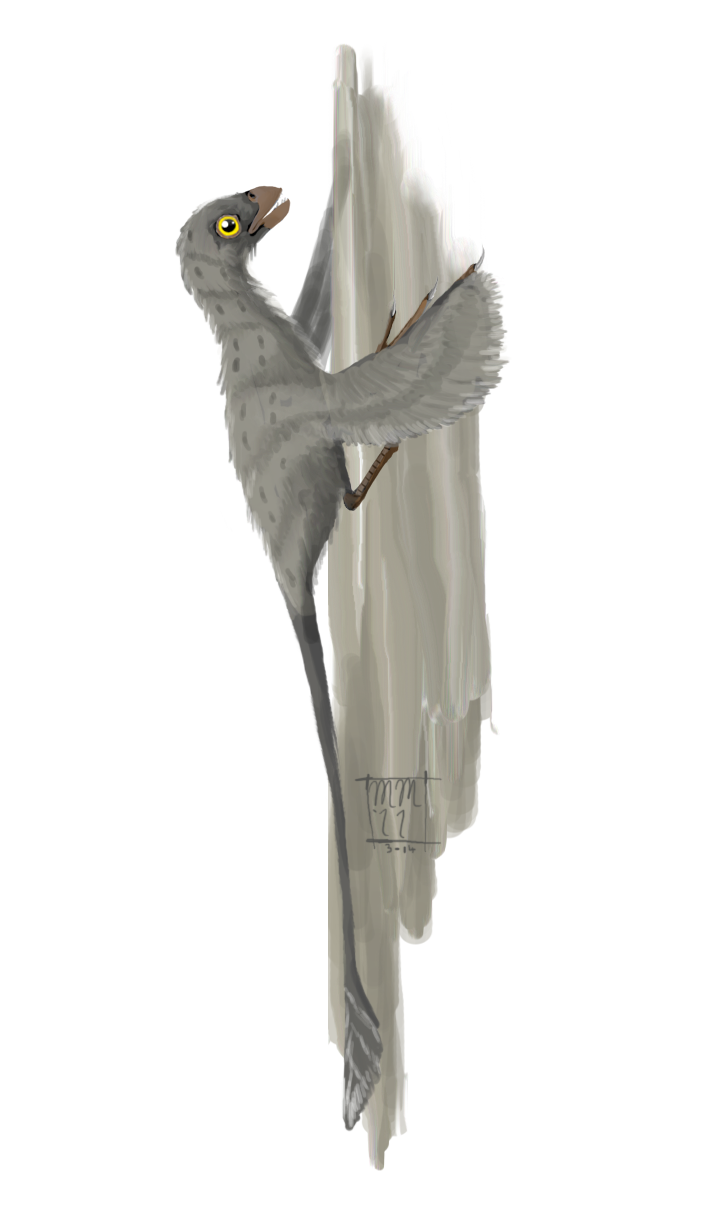
Life restoration of a hatchling specimen.

In describing Scansoriopteryx, Czerkas & Yuan cited evidence for an arboreal (tree-dwelling) lifestyle. They noted that, unlike all modern bird hatchlings, the forelimbs of Scansoriopteryx are longer than the hind limbs. The authors argued that this anomaly indicates the forelimbs played an important role in locomotion even at an extremely early developmental stage. Scansoriopteryx has a well-preserved foot, and the authors interpreted the hallux as reversed, the condition of a backward-pointing toe being widespread among modern tree-dwelling birds. Furthermore, the authors pointed to the short, stiffened tail of the Scansoriopteryx specimen as a tree-climbing adaptation. The tail may have been used as a prop, much like the tails of modern woodpeckers. Comparison with the hands of modern climbing species with elongated third digits, like iguanid lizards, also supports the tree-climbing hypothesis. Indeed, the hands of Scansoriopteryx are much better adapted to climbing than the modern tree-climbing hatchling of the hoatzin.

The Epidendrosaurus was also interpreted as arboreal based on the elongated hand and specializations in the foot. The describing authors stated that the long hand and strongly curved claws are adaptations for climbing and moving around among tree branches. They viewed this as an early stage in the evolution of the bird wing, stating that the forelimbs became well-developed for climbing, and that this development later lead to the evolution of a wing capable of flight. They stated that long, grasping hands are more suited to climbing than to flight, since most flying birds have relatively short hands.

Zhang et al. also noted that the foot of Epidendrosaurus is unique among non-avian theropods. While the Epidendrosaurus specimen does not preserve a reversed hallux, the backward-facing toe seen in modern perching birds, its foot was very similar in construction to more primitive perching birds like Cathayornis and Longipteryx. These adaptations for grasping ability in all four limbs makes it likely that Epidendrosaurus spent a significant amount of time living in trees.

=== Feathers and scales ===
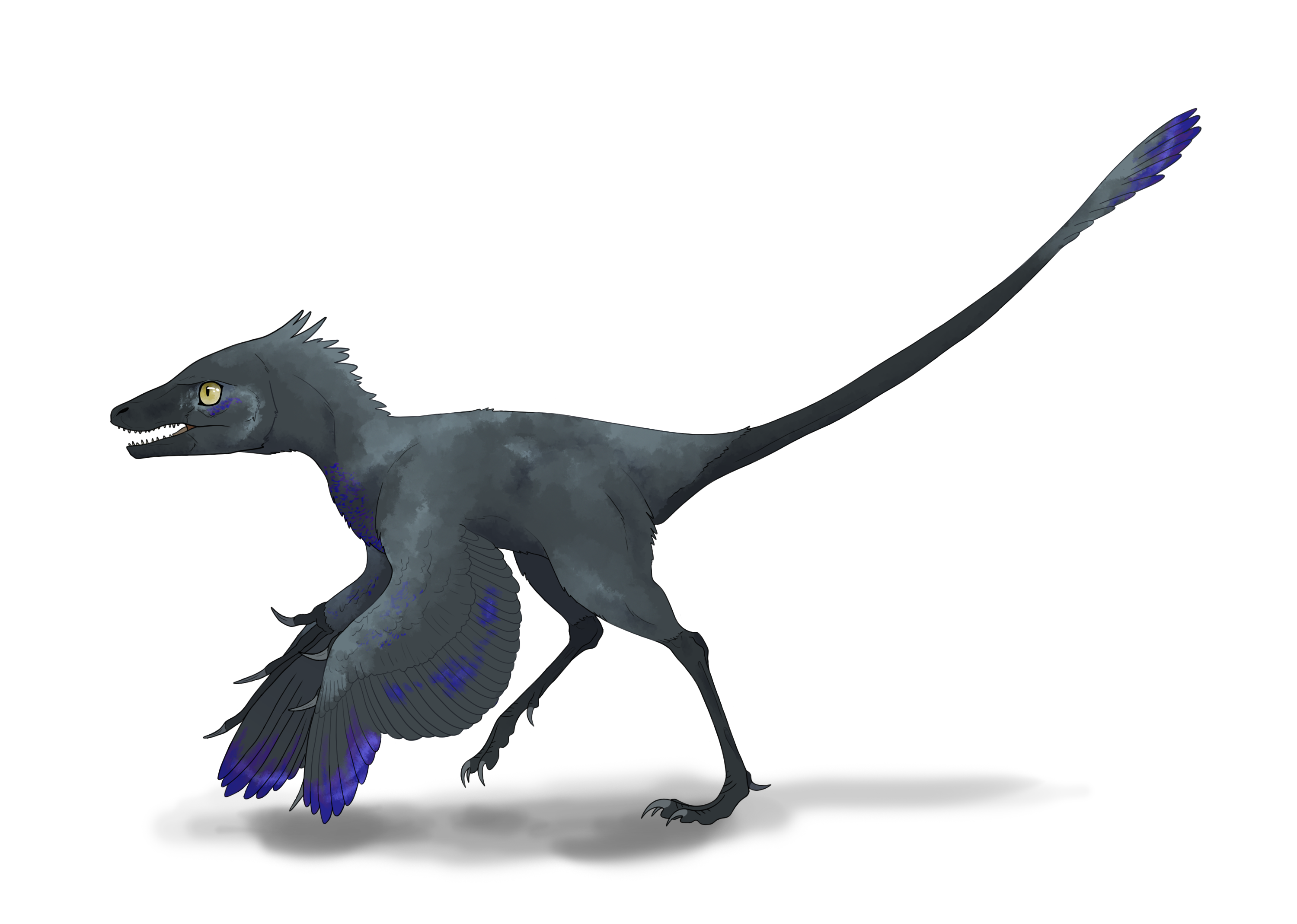
A reconstruction of Epidendrosaurus ningchengensis, sometimes considered to be a junior synonym.

Scansoriopteryx fossils preserve impressions of wispy, down-like feathers around select parts of the body, forming V-shaped patterns similar to those seen in modern down feathers. The most prominent feather impressions trail from the left forearm and hand. The longer feathers in this region led Czerkas and Yuan to speculate that adult scansoriopterygids may have had reasonably well-developed wing feathers which could have aided in leaping or rudimentary gliding, though they ruled out the possibility that Scansoriopteryx could have achieved powered flight. Like other maniraptorans, Scansoriopteryx had a semilunate (half-moon shaped) bone in the wrist that allowed for bird-like folding motion in the hand. Even if powered flight was not possible, this motion could have aided maneuverability in leaping from branch to branch. Reticulate scales were preserved in the proximal portion of the second metatarsal, and the Epidendrosaurus specimen also preserved faint feather impressions at the end of the tail, similar to the pattern found in Microraptor.

== Paleoecology ==
The holotype skeleton of Epidendrosaurus was recovered from the Daohugou fossil beds of northeastern China. In the past, there has been some uncertainty regarding the age of these beds. Various papers have placed the fossils here anywhere from the Middle Jurassic period (169 million years ago) to the Early Cretaceous period (122 ma). The age of this formation has implications for the relationship between Epidendrosaurus and similar dinosaurs, as well as for the origin of birds in general. A Middle Jurassic age would mean that the bird-like dinosaurs in the Daohugou beds are older than the "first bird", Archaeopteryx, which was Late Jurassic in age. The provenance of Scansoriopteryx is uncertain, though Wang et al. (2006), in their study of the age of the Daohugou, suggest that it probably hails from the same beds, and thus is likely a synonym of Epidendrosaurus.

== Classification ==
Scansoriopteryx lent its name to the family Scansoriopterygidae. Studies of dinosaur relationships have found Scansoriopteryx to be a close relative of true birds and a member of the clade Avialae.

The status of the name Scansoriopteryx has been controversial. The type specimen was described only a few months after a very similar specimen, Epidendrosaurus ninchengensis, was described online, though the name Epidendrosaurus was not published in print until after Scansoriopteryx. These two specimens are so similar that they may be the same genus, in which case Article 21 of the International Code of Zoological Nomenclature (ICZN) would give priority to Scansoriopteryx. The journal in which Scansoriopteryx appeared has a very small circulation, but was distributed on roughly 2002-09-02, before the print appearance of Epidendrosaurus, but well after the later's appearance on the Internet, enough time for the name Epidendrosaurus to have come into wide use by experts. This situation was used as an example in a proposed amendment to the ICZN by Jerry Harris that would consider electronic articles with Digital Object Identifiers (DOIs) that are subsequently available in print to qualify as "publication" for naming purposes. Harris noted that while the name Epidendrosarus appeared first, Scansoriopteryx was the first to be published in print and is therefore the valid name, but the fact that the ICZN does not recognize online names as valid has led to confusion over which has priority. In scientific literature, the genus Scansoriopteryx has been treated as a senior synonym of Epidendrosaurus by some scientists, such as Alan Feduccia, and as a junior synonym by others such as Thomas R. Holtz, Jr. and Kevin Padian.

=== Alternate interpretations ===
Czerkas and Yuan used the suite of primitive and birdlike characters in Scansoriopteryx to argue for an unorthodox interpretation of dinosaur evolution. They stated that Scansoriopteryx was "clearly more primitive than Archaeopteryx", based on its primitive, "saurischian-style" pubis and robust ischia. Scansoriopteryx also lacks a fully perforated acetabulum, the hole in the hip socket which is a key characteristic of Dinosauria and has traditionally been used to define the group. While the authors allowed that the hole may have closed secondarily, having evolved from a more traditional dinosaurian hip socket, they cited the other primitive features to argue that it is a true primitive trait, which would make Scansoriopteryx among the most birdlike and the most primitive known dinosaurs. Czerkas and Yuan called it a "proto-maniraptoran", supporting the hypothesis of Gregory S. Paul that the larger, ground-dwelling maniraptorans like Velociraptor evolved from small, flying or gliding forms that lived in trees. The authors took this idea further than Paul, however, and lent support to George Olshevsky's 1992 "birds came first" hypothesis, that all true theropods are secondarily flightless or at least secondarily arboreal, having evolved from small, tree-dwelling, Scansoriopteryx-like ancestors. Czerkas and Yuan also argued that, contrary to most phylogenetic trees, maniraptorans form a separate lineage from other theropods, and that this split occurred very early in theropod evolution.

In 2014, Czerkas, along with Alan Feduccia, published a paper further describing Scansoriopteryx and stating their opinion that certain archaic features of the skeleton and the hypothesis that it was arboreal ruled out the possibility that it was a theropod or even a dinosaur, but that Scansoriopteryx and all birds evolved from non-dinosaurian avemetatarsalian archosaurs like Scleromochlus. This conclusion has been overwhelmingly rejected by other paleontologists due to the clear morphological similarities scansoriopterygids have to other maniraptoran dinosaurs.
