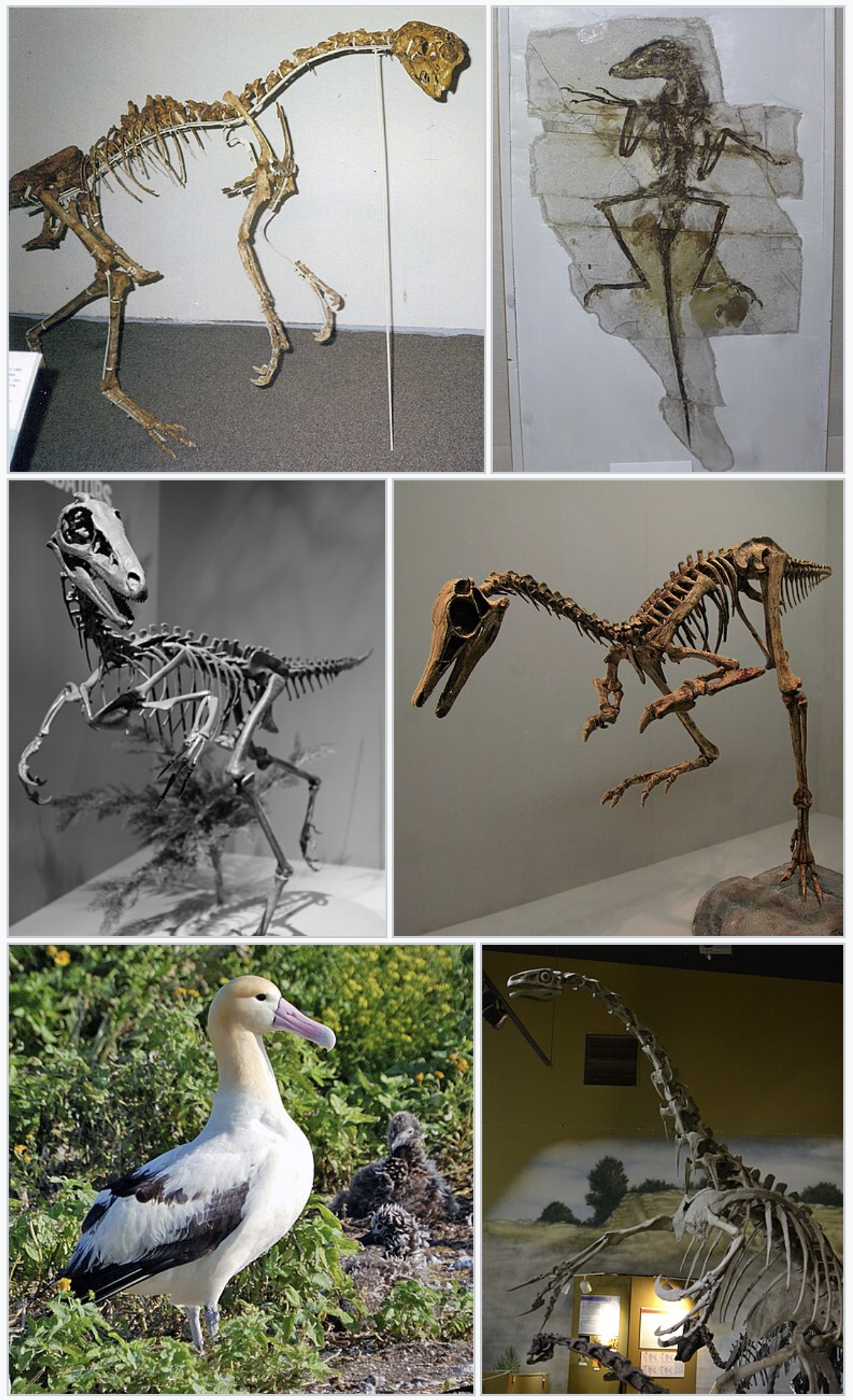
- Collage of six maniraptorans. From top left to right: the Zamyn Khondt oviraptorid, Sinornithosaurus, the Prince Creek troodontid, Patagonykus, a short-tailed albatross, and Nothronychus

Scientific classification
- Kingdom: Animalia
- Phylum: Chordata
- Class: Reptilia
- Clade: Dinosauria
- Clade: Saurischia
- Clade: Theropoda
- Clade: Maniraptoriformes
- Clade: Maniraptora; Gauthier, 1986

Subgroups
- †Fukuivenator; †Juravenator?; †Migmanychion; †Ornitholestes?; †Unquillosaurus; †Yaverlandia; †Alvarezsauroidea; †Therizinosauria; Pennaraptora Foth, Tischlinger & Rauhut, 2014; †Oviraptorosauria; †Scansoriopterygidae; Paraves

Synonyms
- Metornithes Perle et al., 1993

= Maniraptora =

Maniraptorans Temporal range: Middle Jurassic–Present, 165–0 Ma Possible Early Jurassic record

Clade of feathered dinosaurs

Maniraptora is a clade of coelurosaurian dinosaurs which includes birds and the non-avian dinosaurs that were more closely related to them than to Ornithomimus velox. It contains the major subgroups Avialae, Dromaeosauridae, Troodontidae, Oviraptorosauria, and Therizinosauria. Ornitholestes and the Alvarezsauroidea are also often included. Together with the next closest sister group, the Ornithomimosauria, Maniraptora comprises the more inclusive clade Maniraptoriformes. Maniraptorans first appear in the fossil record during the Jurassic Period (see Eshanosaurus), and survive today as living birds.

== Description ==
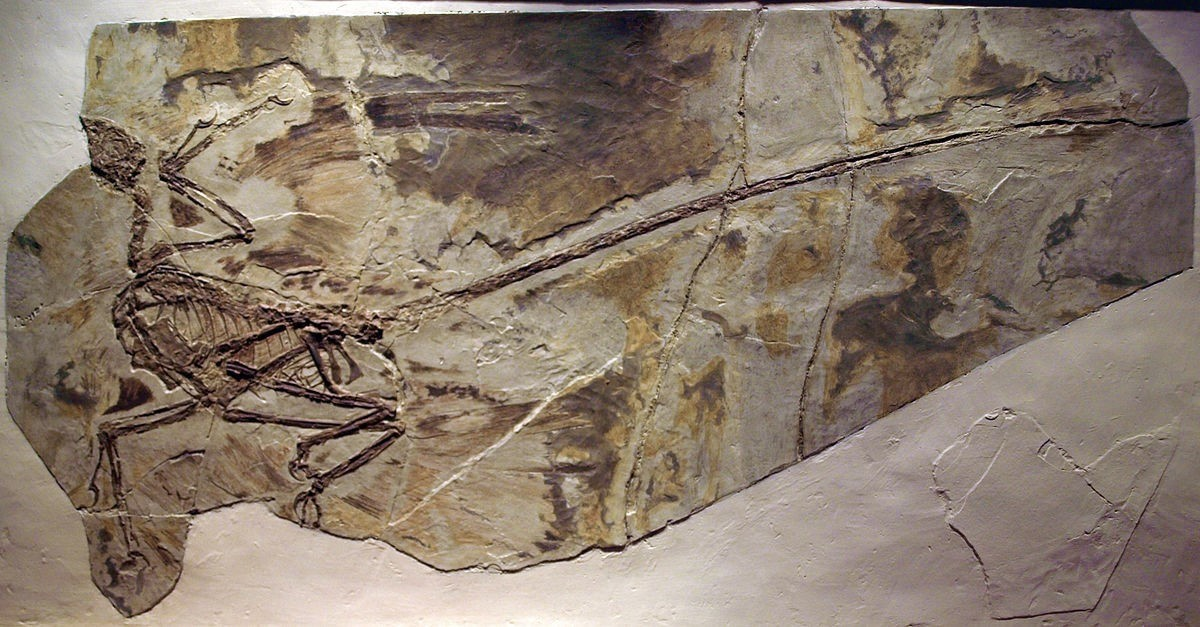
Microraptor specimen with feather impressions

Maniraptorans are characterized by long arms and three-fingered hands (though reduced or fused in some lineages), as well as a half-moon shaped (semi-lunate) bone in the wrist (carpus). In 2004, Tom Holtz and Halszka Osmólska pointed out six other maniraptoran characteristics relating to specific details of the skeleton. Unlike most other saurischian dinosaurs, which have pubic bones that point forward, several groups of maniraptorans have an ornithischian-like backwards-pointing hip bone. A backward-pointing hip characterizes the therizinosaurs, dromaeosaurids, avialans, and some primitive troodontids. The fact that the backward-pointing hip is present in so many diverse maniraptoran groups has led most scientists to conclude that the "primitive" forward-pointing hip seen in advanced troodontids and oviraptorosaurs is an evolutionary reversal, and that these groups evolved from ancestors with backward-pointing hips.

== Technical diagnosis ==
Holtz and Osmólska (2004) diagnosed the clade Maniraptora based on the following characters: reduced or absent olecranon process of the ulna, greater trochanter and cranial trochanter of the femur fused into a trochanteric crest. An elongated, backwards-pointing pubic bone is present in therizinosauroids, dromaeosaurids, avialans, and the basal troodontid Sinovenator, which suggests that the propubic condition in advanced troodontids and oviraptorosaurs is a reversal. Turner et al. (2007) named seven synapomorphies that diagnose Maniraptora.

== Feathers and flight ==
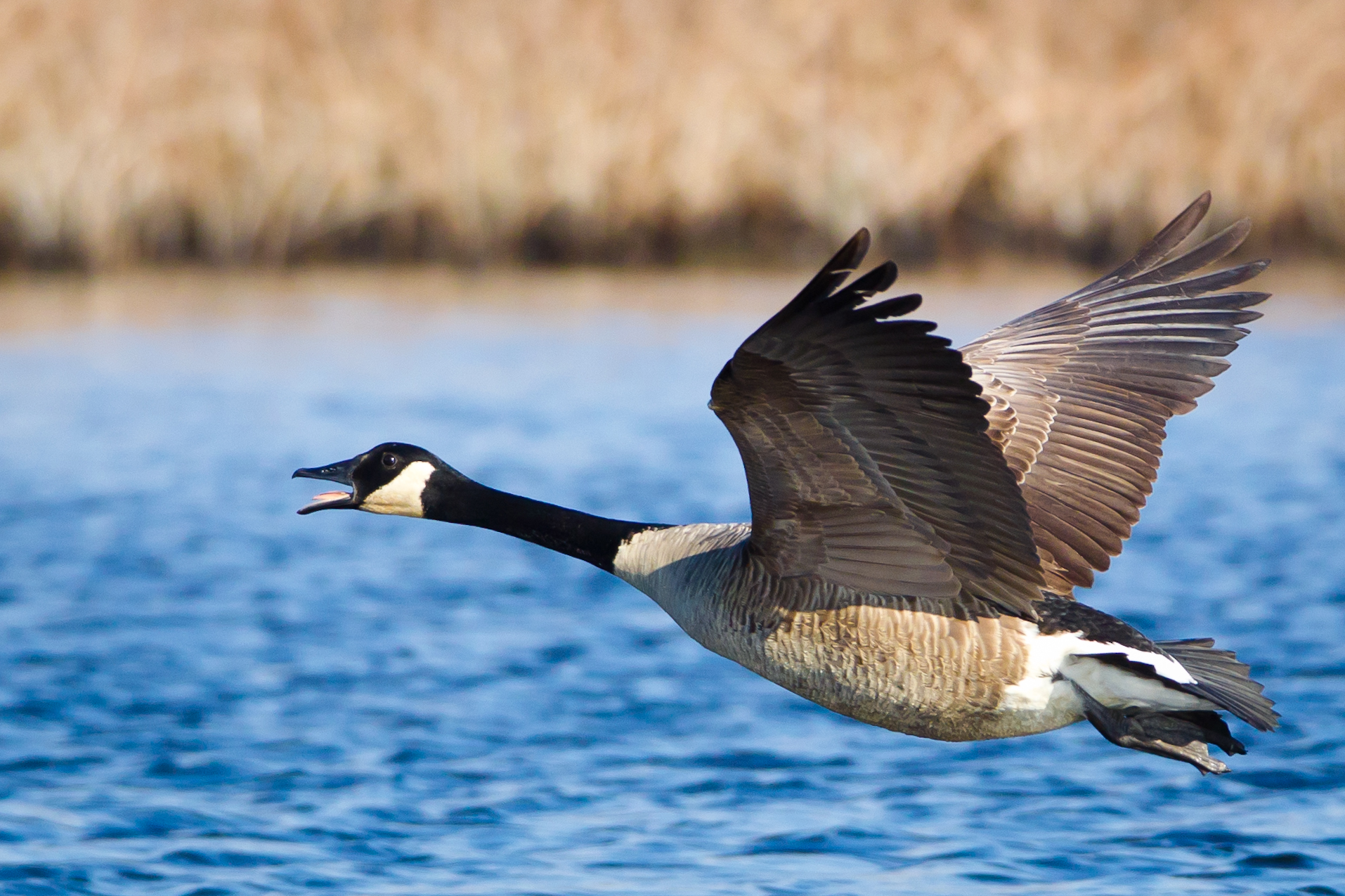
Canada goose in flight

Modern pennaceous feathers and remiges are known in the advanced maniraptoran group Aviremigia. More primitive maniraptorans, such as therizinosaurs (specifically Beipiaosaurus), preserve a combination of simple downy filaments and unique elongated quills. Simple feathers are known from more primitive coelurosaurs such as Sinosauropteryx prima, and possibly from even more distantly related species such as the ornithischian Tianyulong confuciusi and the flying pterosaurs. Thus it appears as if some form of feathers or down-like integument would have been present in all maniraptorans, at least when they were young.

Maniraptora is the only dinosaur group known to include flying members, though how far back in this lineage flight extends is controversial. Powered and/or gliding flight is believed to have been present in some types of non-avialan paravians, including dromaeosaurids, such as Rahonavis and Microraptor. Zhenyuanlong suni, a dromaeosaurid, was too heavy to fly but still had wings with feathers required for flying, which suggests its ancestors had the ability for aerial locomotion. Other groups, like the Oviraptorosauria who had a tail with a tail fan of feathers with caudal anatomy resembling a pygostyle, are not known to have been capable of flight, but some scientists, such as Gregory S. Paul, have suggested that they could be descended from ancestors which flew. Paul has gone as far as to propose that Therizinosauria, Alvarezsauroidea, and the non-maniraptoran group Ornithomimosauria also descended from flying ancestors.

== Classification ==
The Maniraptora was originally named by Jacques Gauthier in 1986, for a branch-based clade defined as all dinosaurs closer to modern birds than to the ornithomimids. Gauthier noted that this group could be easily characterized by their long forelimbs and hands, which he interpreted as adaptations for grasping (hence the name Maniraptora, which means "hand snatchers" in relation to their 'seizing hands'). In 1994, Thomas R. Holtz attempted to define the group based on the characteristics of the hand and wrist alone (an apomorphy-based definition), and included the long, thin fingers, bowed, wing-like forearm bones, and half-moon shaped wrist bone as key characters. Most subsequent studies have not followed this definition, however, preferring the earlier branch-based definition.

The branch-based definition usually includes the major groups Dromaeosauridae, Troodontidae, Oviraptorosauria, Therizinosauria, and Avialae. Other taxa often found to be maniraptorans include the alvarezsaurs and Ornitholestes. Several taxa have been assigned to the Maniraptora more definitively, though their exact placement within the group remains uncertain. These forms include the scansoriopterygids, Pedopenna, and Yixianosaurus.

In 1993, Perle and colleagues coined the name Metornithes to include alvarezsaurids and modern birds, which the researchers believed were members of the Avialae. This group was defined as a clade by Luis Chiappe in 1995 as the last common ancestor of Mononykus and modern birds, and all its descendants.

Pennaraptora (Latin penna "bird feather" + raptor "thief", from rapere "snatch"; a feathered bird-like predator) is a clade within Maniraptora, defined as the most recent common ancestor of Oviraptor philoceratops, Deinonychus antirrhopus, and Passer domesticus (the house sparrow), and all descendants thereof, by Foth et al., 2014.

The clade "Aviremigia" was conditionally proposed along with several other apomorphy-based clades relating to birds by Jacques Gauthier and Kevin de Queiroz in a 2001 paper. Their proposed definition for the group was "the clade stemming from the first panavian with ... remiges and rectrices, that is, enlarged, stiff-shafted, closed-vaned (= barbules bearing hooked distal pennulae), pennaceous feathers arising from the distal forelimbs and tail". Ancestral morphology relating to pennaceous feathers suggests that basal species of Pennaraptora were capable of scansorial locomotion and gliding, and further evolution of said adaptation within the clade would eventually give rise to the origin of flight in avian species.

The following cladogram follows the results of a phylogenetic study by Cau (2020).

- Maniraptora
  - †Alvarezsauroidea
  - - †Therizinosauridae
    - Pennaraptora
      - †Oviraptorosauria
      - Paraves
        - †Dromaeosauridae
        - Averaptora
          - †Troodontidae
          - Avialae

=== Alternative interpretations ===
In 2002, Czerkas and Yuan reported that some maniraptoran traits, such as a long, backwards-pointed pubis and short ischia were present in Scansoriopteryx, a scansoriopterygid. The authors considered it to be more primitive than true theropods, and hypothesized that maniraptorans may have branched off from theropods at a very early point, or may even have descended from pre-theropod dinosaurs. Zhang et al., in describing the closely related or conspecific specimen Epidendrosaurus (now considered a synonym of Scansoriopteryx), did not report any of the primitive traits mentioned by Czerkas and Yuan, but did find that the shoulder blade of Epidendrosaurus appeared primitive. Despite this, they placed Epidendrosaurus firmly within Maniraptora due to a number of synapomorphies.

== Paleobiology ==
=== Diet ===
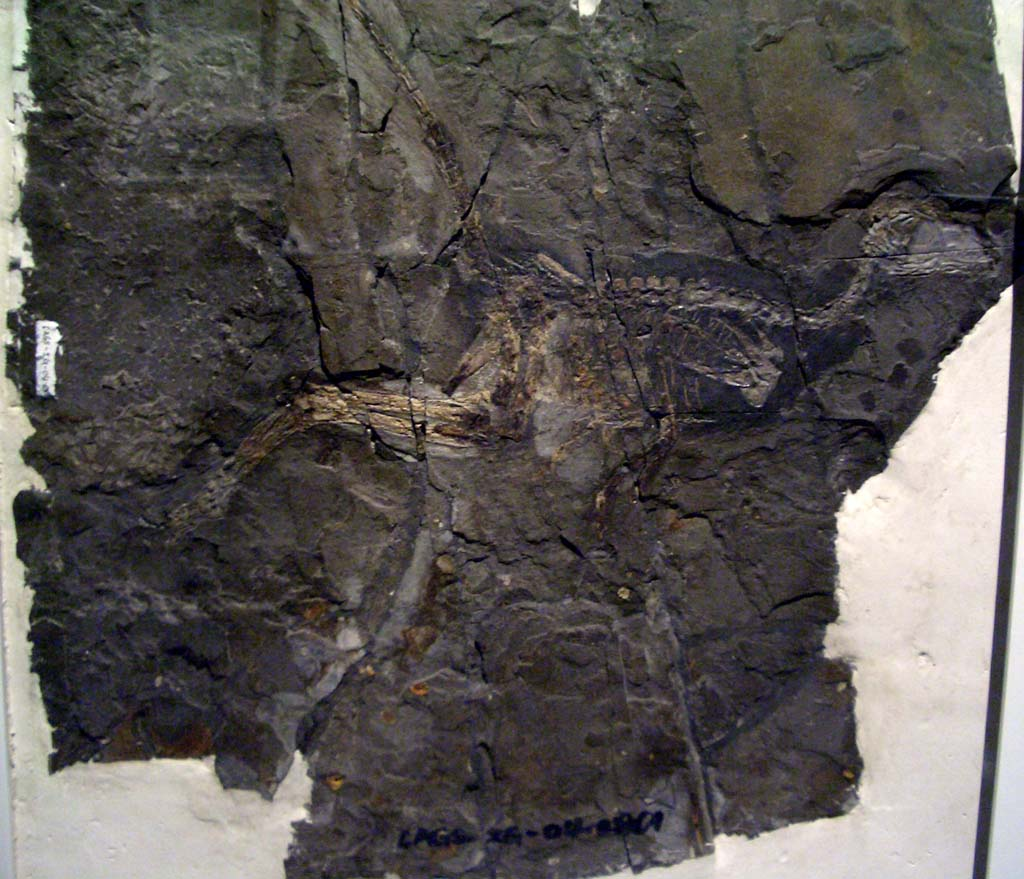
Jinfengopteryx elegans specimen with seeds preserved in the stomach region

Scientists traditionally assumed that maniraptorans were ancestrally hypercarnivorous, that is, that most non-avialan species primarily ate and hunted only other vertebrates. However, a number of discoveries made during the first decade of the 21st century, as well as re-evaluation of older evidence, began to suggest that maniraptorans were a primarily omnivorous group, including a number of sub-groups that ate mainly plants, insects, or other food sources besides meat. Additionally, phylogenetic studies of maniraptoran relationships began to more consistently show that herbivorous or omnivorous groups were spread throughout the Maniraptora, rather than representing a single side-branch as previously thought. This led scientists such as Lindsay Zanno to conclude that the ancestral maniraptoran must have been omnivorous, giving rise to several purely herbivorous groups (such as the therizinosaurs, primitive oviraptorosaurs, and some avialans) and that, among non-avians, only one group reverted to pure carnivores (the dromaeosaurids). Most other groups fell somewhere in between the two extremes, with alvarezsaurids and some avialans being insectivorous, and with advanced oviraptorosaurs and troodontids being omnivorous.

=== Reproduction ===
A 2023 study analyzing fossil eggshells assigned to Troodon with clumped isotope thermometry found that Troodon, and likely other non-avian maniraptorans, had a slowed calcification of eggs akin to that of most reptiles. This contrasts with the rapid calcification of eggs found in modern birds, indicating that most maniraptorans aside from birds retained this basal trait. This would also indicate that most non-avian maniraptorans possessed two functional ovaries, contrasting with the one functional ovary in birds, and were thus limited in the numbers of eggs each individual could produce.
