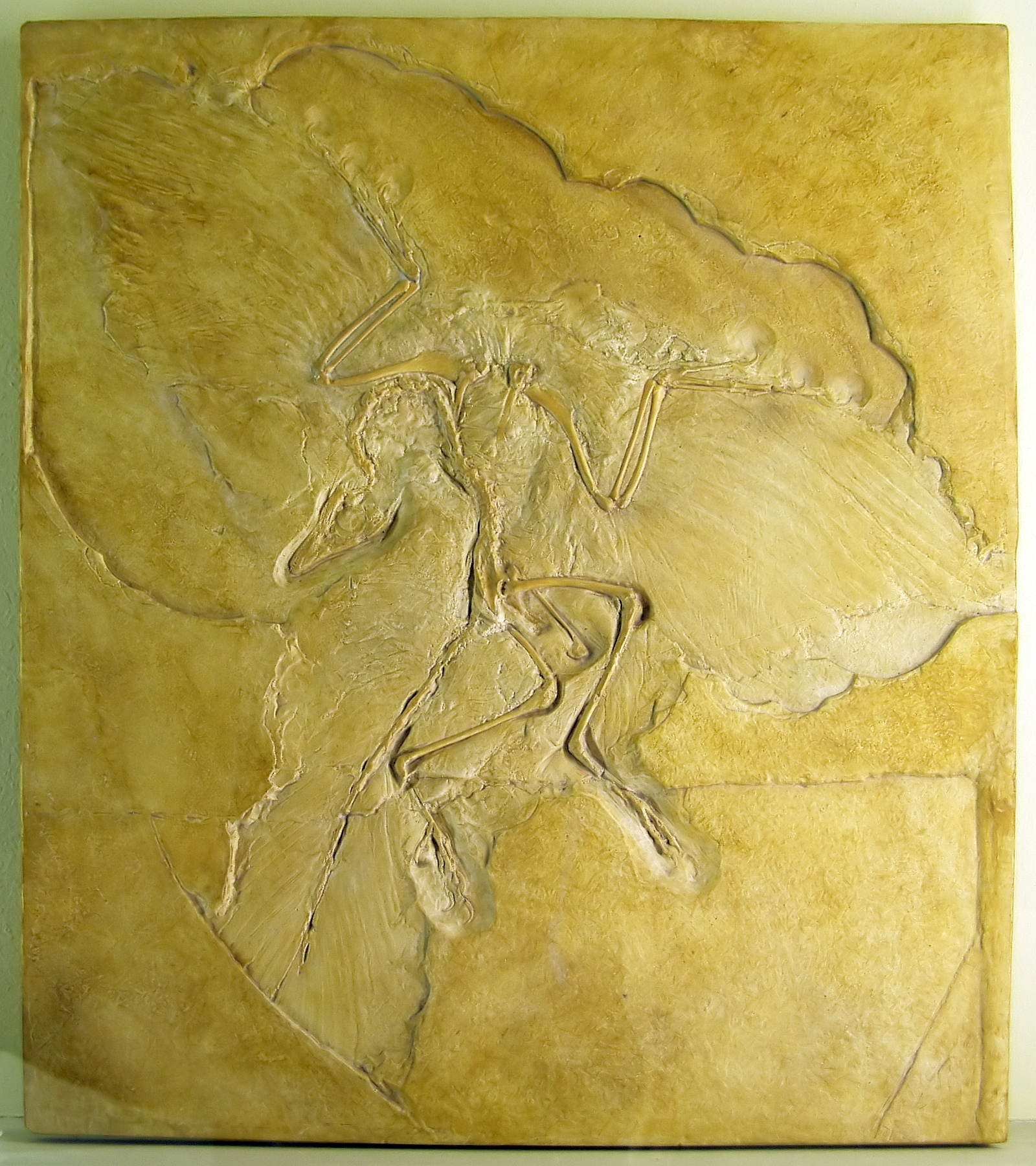
- Berlin specimen of Archaeopteryx lithographica

Scientific classification
- Kingdom: Animalia
- Phylum: Chordata
- Class: Reptilia
- Clade: Dinosauria
- Clade: Saurischia
- Clade: Theropoda
- Clade: Paraves
- Family: †Archaeopterygidae; Huxley, 1871 (conserved name)

Type species
- †Archaeopteryx lithographica von Meyer, 1861 (conserved name)

Genera and possible subfamily
- †Archaeopteryx; †Wellnhoferia; †Anchiornithinae?

Synonyms
- Archaeornithidae Petronievics 1925; Archaeopteridae (sic) Shufeldt 1903; Archornithidae Carus 1875; Anchiornithidae? Xu et al. 2016

= Archaeopterygidae =

Archaeopterygidae Temporal range: 150.8–148.5 Ma Possible Middle Jurassic and Early Cretaceous records if Anchiornithids are a subfamily.

Family of dinosaurs

Archaeopterygidae is a clade of paravian dinosaurs, known from the latest Jurassic and earliest Cretaceous of Europe. In most current classifications, it contains only the genera Archaeopteryx and Wellnhoferia. As its name suggests, Protarchaeopteryx was also once referred to this group, but most paleontologists now consider it an oviraptorosaur. Other referred genera, like Jurapteryx, Wellnhoferia, and "Proornis", are probably synonymous with Archaeopteryx (the former two) or do not belong into this group (the last). Jinfengopteryx was originally described as an archaeopterygid, though it was later shown to be a troodontid. A few studies have recovered Anchiornis and Xiaotingia (usually considered part of a distinct clade, Anchiornithidae) to also be members of the Archaeopterygidae, though most subsequent analyses have failed to arrive at the same result. The clade Archaeopterygidae is notable as it contains genera and species that are considered transitional in the fossil record, especially Archaeopteryx lithographica; a species that historically acted as a missing link between dinosaurs and birds. Transitional fossils show a morphological transition from ancient extinct species to modern species. For the clade, Archaeopterygidae, its made up of species whose fossils are theorized to show a transition from dinosaurs to modern birds, hence, why this clade resides in the greater clade of Paraves. This greater clade contains modern extant birds, extinct birds, and bird-like species; including some dinosaurs. Uncertainties still exist, due to the interpretation of fossil evidence being theoretical. As a result, it may not be possible to confidently state whether archaeopterygids are more closely related to modern birds or to deinonychosaurs barring new and better specimens of relevant species. Teeth attributable to archaeopterygids are known from the earliest Cretaceous (Berriasian) Cherves-de-Cognac locality and the Angeac-Charente bonebed of France.

== Classification ==
The family Archaeopterygidae is the only family in the order Archaeopterygiformes, which was coined by Max Fürbringer in 1888 to contain Archaeopterygidae and genus Archaeopteryx. A formal phylogenetic definition for Archaeopterygidae was given by Xu and colleagues in 2011: the clade comprising all animals closer to Archaeopteryx than to the house sparrow or Dromaeosaurus.

The family Dromaeosauridae, traditionally considered to be non-avian dinosaurs, have been included in this group by at least one author, although the group was paraphyletic in that classification, with Dromaeosaurus and Velociraptor (including Deinonychus and Saurornitholestes) being more closely related to modern birds than Archaeopteryx was. Discoveries of a number of primitive forms have muddied the relationships of early birds, making it possible that Velociraptor and Deinonychus could be considered birds as they might have evolved from flying ancestors. Palaeoartist Gregory S. Paul placed dromaeosaurids in Archaeopterygidae for these reasons, though the eventual cladistic definition of Archaeopterygidae explicitly excluded them.

The family Anchiornithidae has had some of the members or the entirety of the group placed as archaeopterygids in various systematic studies. The cladogram below shows the results of the phylogenetic analysis by Cau (2020).

- - Archaeopteryx lithographica
  - - Archaeopteryx albersdoerferi
    - - - Xiaotingia
        - Yixianosaurus
      - - Serikornis
        - - Eosinopteryx
          - - Anchiornis
            - - Aurornis
              - Caihong
