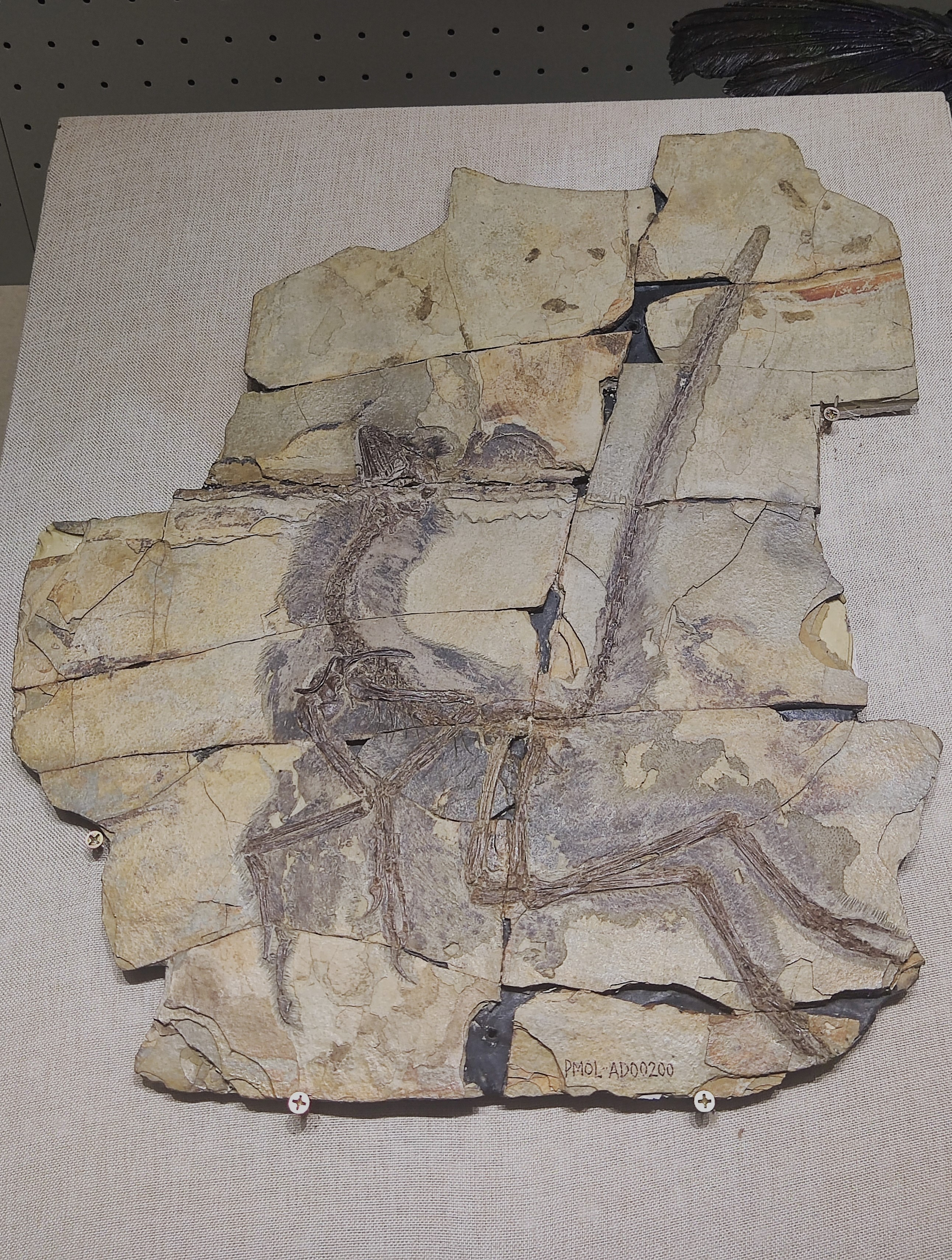
- Holotype, Liaoning Palaeontological Museum

Scientific classification
- Kingdom: Animalia
- Phylum: Chordata
- Class: Reptilia
- Clade: Dinosauria
- Clade: Saurischia
- Clade: Theropoda
- Clade: Paraves
- Family: †Anchiornithidae
- Genus: †Serikornis; Lefèvre et al., 2017
- Species: †S. sungei

Binomial name
- †Serikornis sungei Lefèvre et al., 2017

= Serikornis =

Serikornis Temporal range: Late Jurassic, Oxfordian

Extinct genus of dinosaurs

Serikornis is a genus of small, feathered anchiornithid dinosaur from the Upper Jurassic Tiaojishan Formation of Liaoning, China. It is represented by the type species Serikornis sungei. Some researchers believe it is a junior synonym of Anchiornis.

== Discovery ==
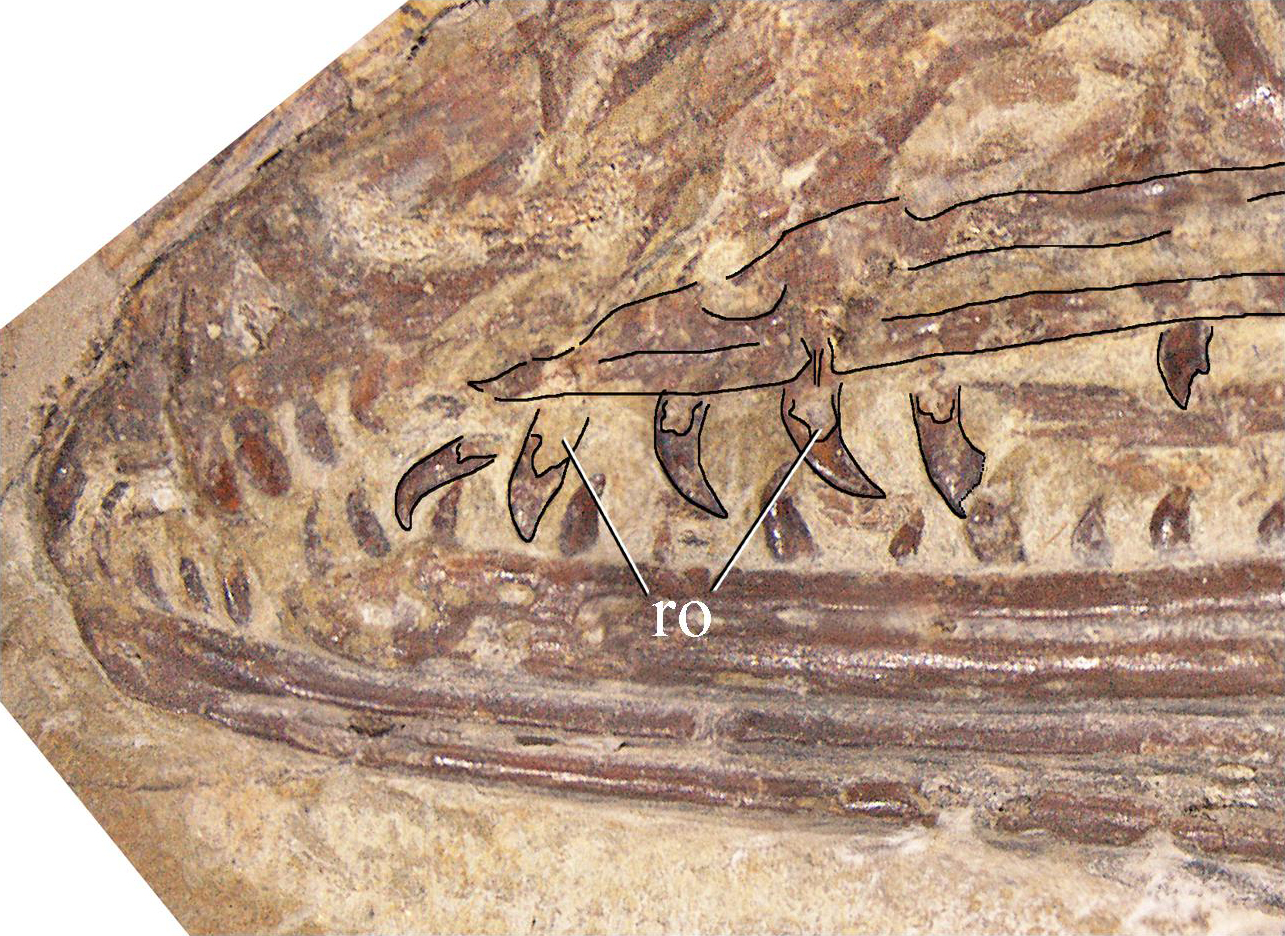
Snout tip of the holotype featuring maxillary dentition

Serikornis, first described in August 2017, is noteworthy for the variety of feather types represented in its holotype, a single complete articulated skeleton preserved on a slab along with extensive integumentary structures. The specimen's feather imprints include wispy bundles along the neck, short and symmetrical vaned feathers on the arms, and both fuzz and long pennaceous feathers on its hindlimbs. While its anatomy and integument share features with birds as well as derived dromaeosaurs such as Microraptor, cladistic analysis places the genus within the cluster of feathered dinosaurs near the origin of avians. It was unlikely to be a flier.

Its name means "Ge Sun's silk bird", a reference to the plumulaceous-like body covering evident in the fossil. The specimen's nickname, "Silky", refers to the striking resemblance of the delicate hindlimb filaments to the modern Silky breed of domestic chicken.

== Description ==
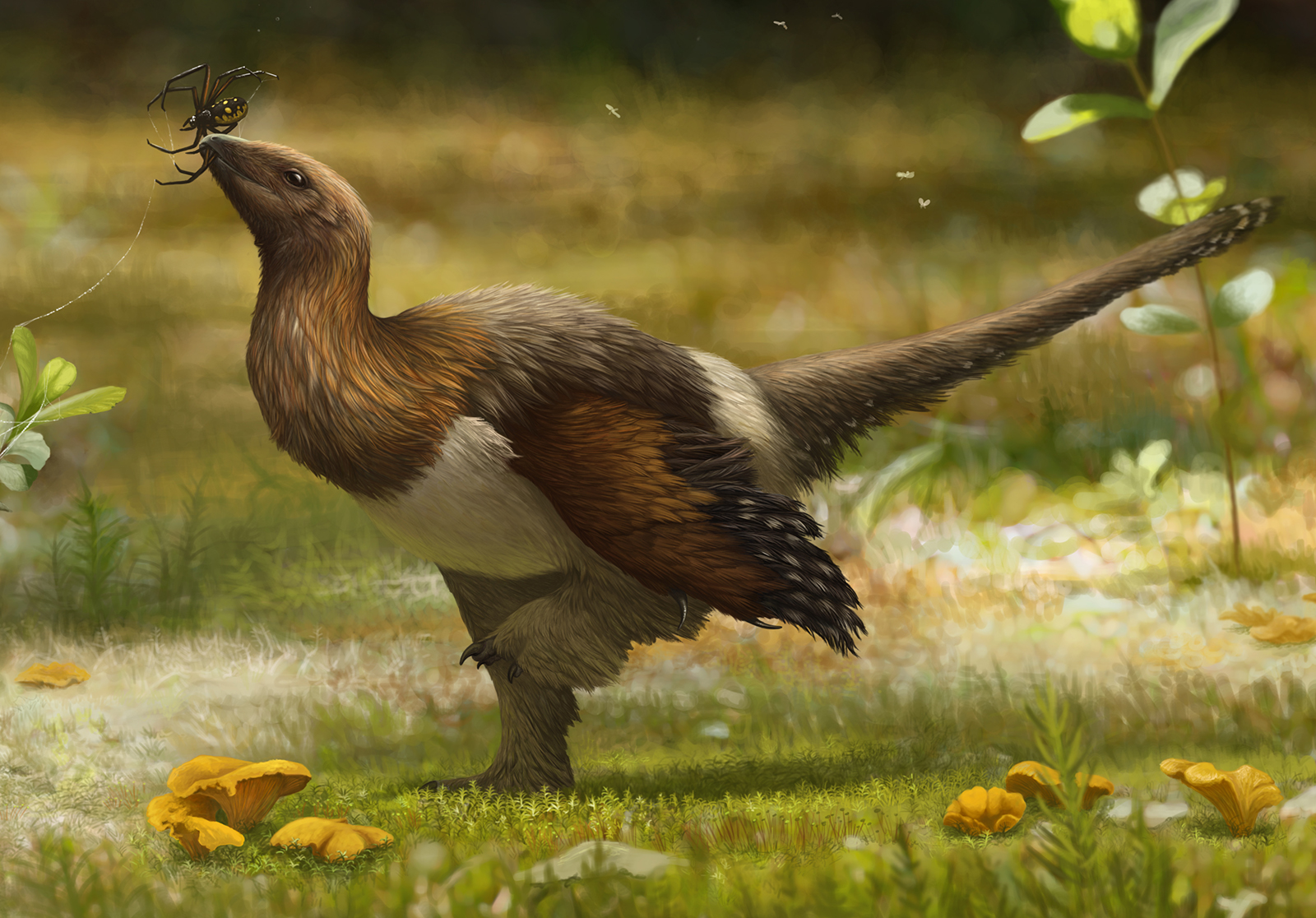
Life restoration by Emily Willoughby

The skeletal morphology of Serikornis suggests a terrestrial ecology without flying adaptations. The tail is covered proximally by filaments and distally by fine rectrices. Symmetrical, barbule-free remiges are attached along the forelimbs and elongated feathers of the hind limbs extend to the toes, suggesting that the remiges of the hind legs had evolved in the maniraptorans residing on the ground before being co-opted to an arboreal lifestyle and possibly, gliding.

The coracoid of Serikornis is devoid of diagnostic ornamentation present in Anchiornis but is distinguished by having the tuberculous coracoid elongated to form a crest. The postacetabular blade of the ilium (bone) is stouter and more squared than in Anchiornis but less robust and quadrangular than in Aurornis. The ischium does not show the particular dorsocaudally straight morphology that is proper of Aurornis, and has a narrow and unciform process. Serikornis is further distinguished by having very large anterior most maxillary teeth, about twice as long as the others. Since the skeleton compressed on a plane, Lefèvre and colleagues have used a new microscan technique called luminography to identify the pneumatic cavity in the vertebrae: the cervical vertebrae have a small pneumatic cavity, which is a derived condition shared by many other coelurosaurian theropods.

In 2019, the supposed distinguishing traits of Serikornis were called into question. Their validity was questioned because they were either misinterpreted or could be considered intraspecific variation with respect to Anchiornis. Thus, some researchers suggested the synonymization of Serikornis with Anchiornis.

== Classification ==
A phylogenetic analysis by Lefèvre et al. (2017) places Serikornis, along with other late Jurassic paravians from China, as basal Paraves, outside Eumaniraptora.

- Pennaraptora
  - †Oviraptorosauria
  - Paraves
    - - †Scansoriopterygidae
      - - †Xiaotingia
        - †Yixianosaurus
    - - - - †Pedopenna
          - †Aurornis
        - - †Serikornis
          - †Eosinopteryx
      - - †Anchiornis
        - Eumaniraptora
          - †Deinonychosauria
            - Troodontidae
            - Dromaeosauridae
          - Avialae
            - †Archaeopteryx
            - - †Rahonavis
              - - †Balaur
                - - †Jeholornithidae
                  - Euavialae

In the 2017 description of Halszkaraptor from Cau et al. (2017), who incorporate the a large-scale phylogenetic matrix in their study placed Serikornis in the newly described family Anchiornithidae, still being grouped with Eosinopteryx.

== See also ==
- 2017 in archosaur paleontology
