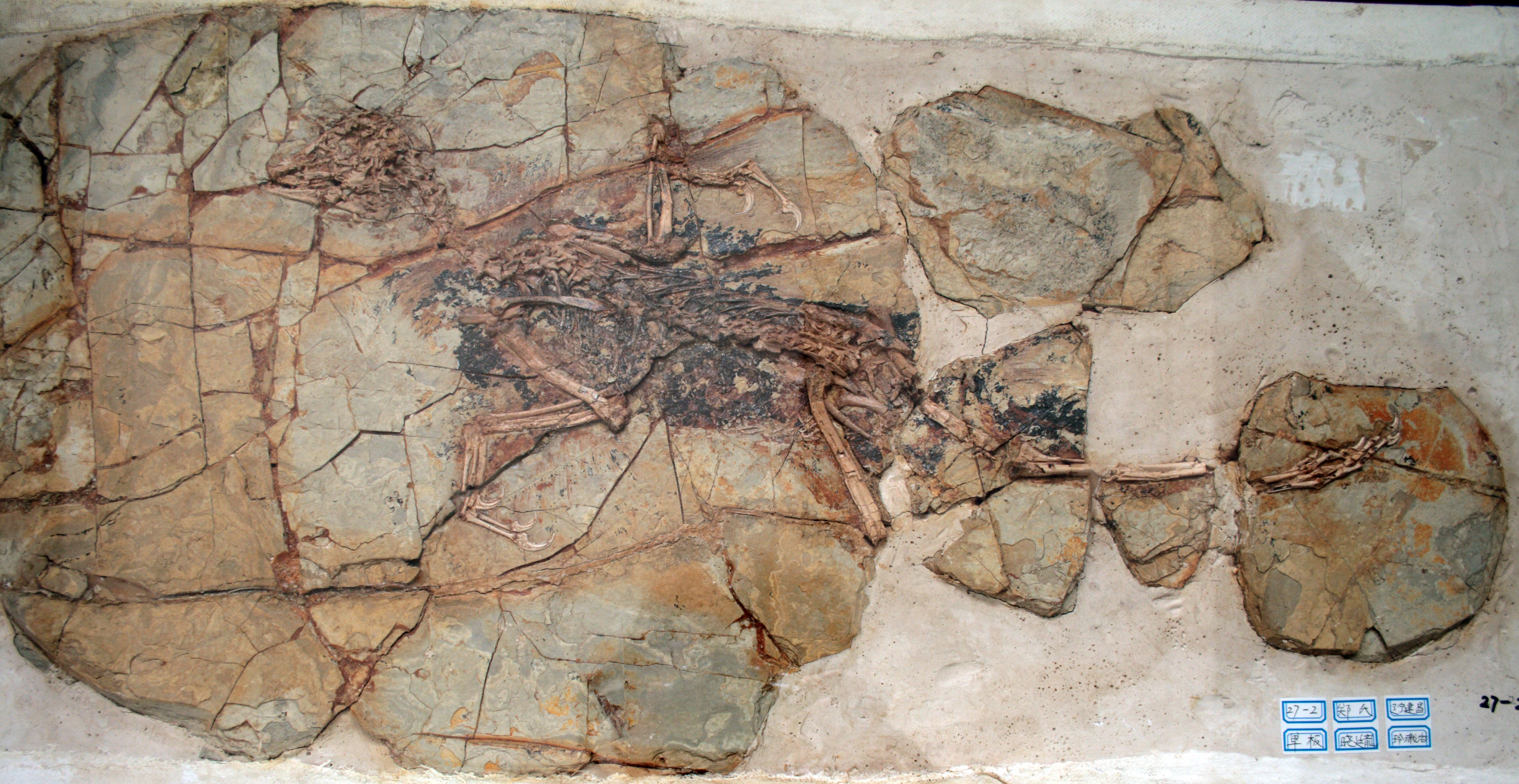
- Type specimen

Scientific classification
- Kingdom: Animalia
- Phylum: Chordata
- Class: Reptilia
- Clade: Dinosauria
- Clade: Saurischia
- Clade: Theropoda
- Family: †Anchiornithidae
- Genus: †Xiaotingia; Xu et al., 2011

Type species
- Xiaotingia zhengi Xu et al., 2011

= Xiaotingia =

Xiaotingia Temporal range: Bathonian–Oxfordian, ~165–153 Ma

Extinct genus of dinosaurs

Xiaotingia is a genus of paravian theropod dinosaur, possibly an anchiornithid, from Middle Jurassic or early Late Jurassic deposits of western Liaoning, China. It contains a single species, Xiaotingia zhengi.

== Discovery ==
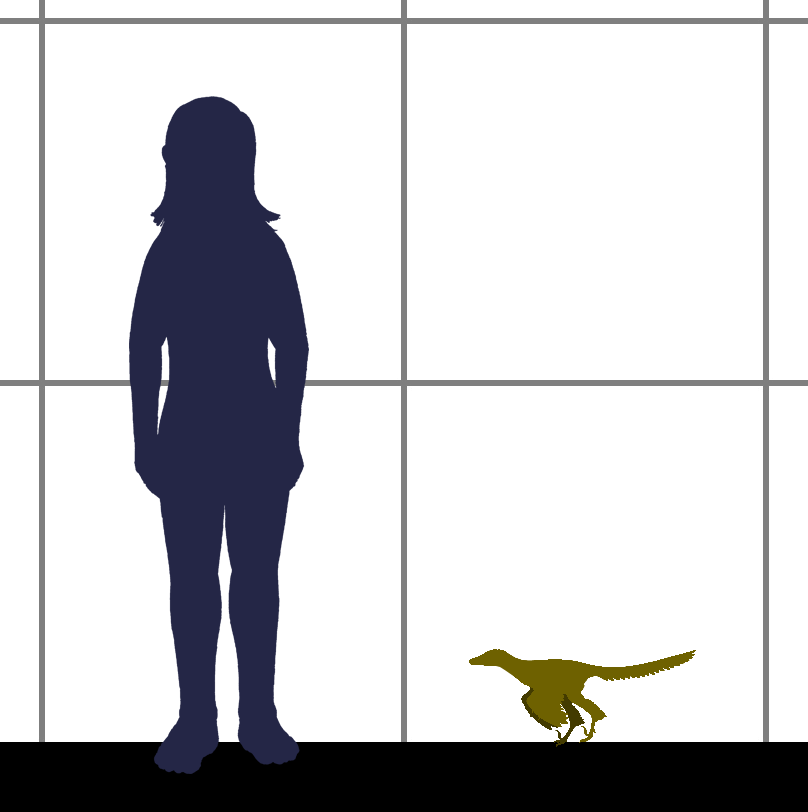
Size of Xiaotingia

Xiaotingia is known from the holotype STM 27-2, an articulated and almost complete skeleton including the skull. It was probably collected in the Linglongta area, Jianchang, from the Tiaojishan Formation.

== Etymology ==
Xiaotingia was first named by Xu Xing, You Hailu, Du Kai and Han Fenglu in 2011 and the type species is Xiaotingia zhengi. The generic name and specific name together honour paleontologist Zheng Xiaoting.

== Description ==
Skeletal mount, Chaoyang Paleontological Museum

Xiaotingia was morphologically similar to other anchiornithids. It was about 60 cm long and weighed an estimated 0.82 kg. It was a small feathered dinosaur that lived in an arboreal environment. Like Archaeopteryx it had long forelimbs. Its femur was longer than its humerus, 84 mm compared to 71 mm, which might indicate that it stood on its hind limbs and could flap its forelimbs to achieve flight.

Xiaotingia had feathers on its head, body, forelimbs and hind limbs. The feathers on the femur were quite long, measuring 55 mm. It also had long pennaceous feathers on its tibia and metatarsus. If Xiaotingia could fly short distances it might also have used its hind limbs as wings.

Xiaotingia had a dentary tooth count probably less than 10 and teeth similar in morphology to those of basal avians.

== Classification ==
The initial analysis by Xu et al. showed that Xiaotingia formed a clade with Archaeopteryx, Dromaeosauridae and Troodontidae to the exclusion of other groups traditionally seen as birds. Xu et al. therefore (re)defined the concepts of Deinonychosauria and Avialae to the extent that Archaeopteryx and Xiaotingia belonged to the Deinonychosauria in the clade Archaeopterygidae. This led to popular reports that "Archaeopteryx is no longer a bird", although Xu et al. noted that there are several competing definitions of the clade Aves currently in use, pointing out that their definitions are compatible with a traditional Aves with Archaeopteryx as a specifier. This phylogenetic hypothesis was challenged by an analysis using different methods published several months later however, in which Archaeopteryx was again recovered as an avialan, while Xiaotingia remained closely allied to Anchiornis within the Troodontidae. In 2012, an expanded and revised version of the initial analysis also found Archaeopteryx to be avialan and Anchiornis to be troodontid, but recovered Xiaotingia as the most primitive member of the clade Dromaeosauridae rather than a close relative of Anchiornis within Troodontidae.

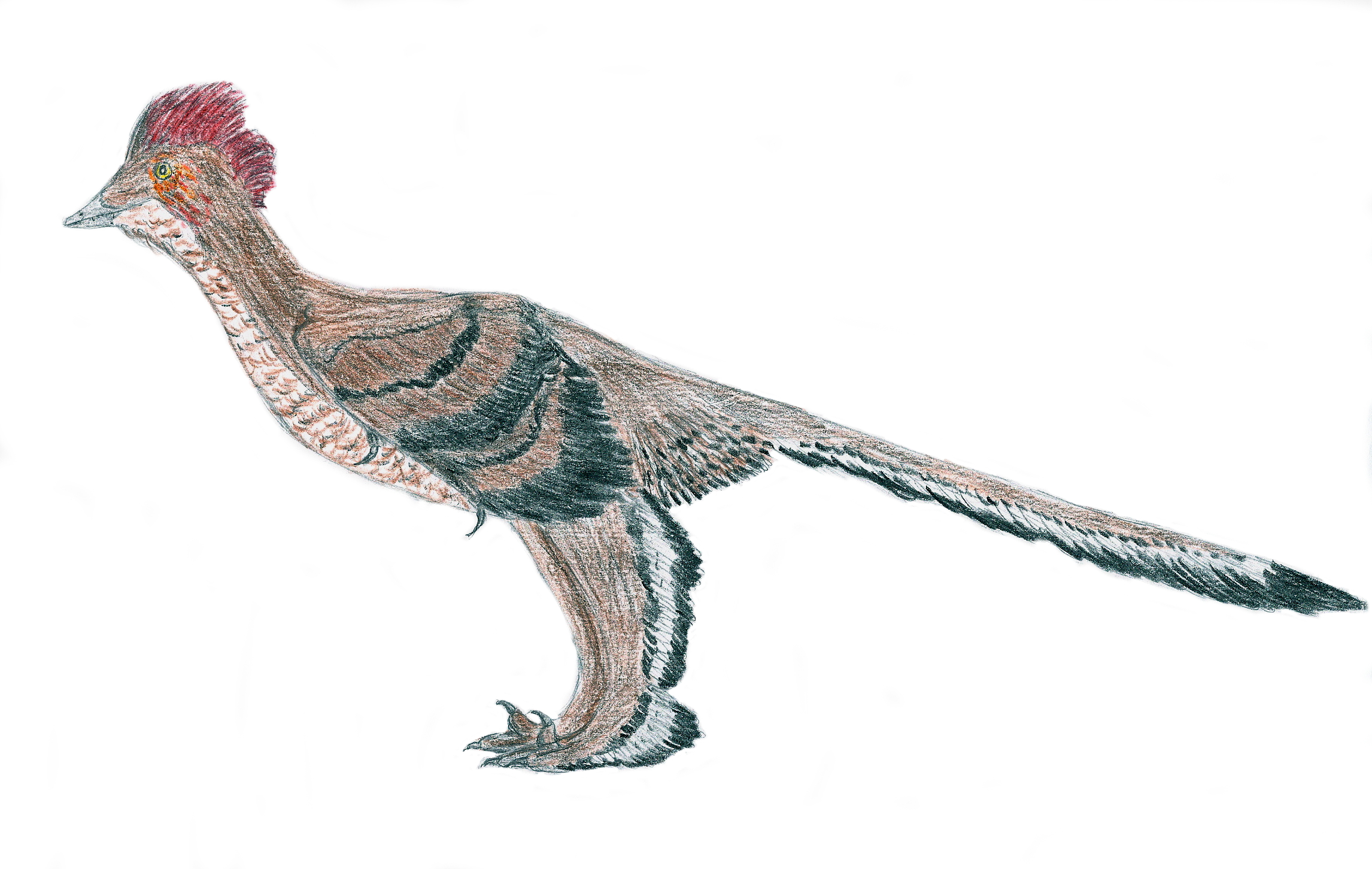
Life restoration

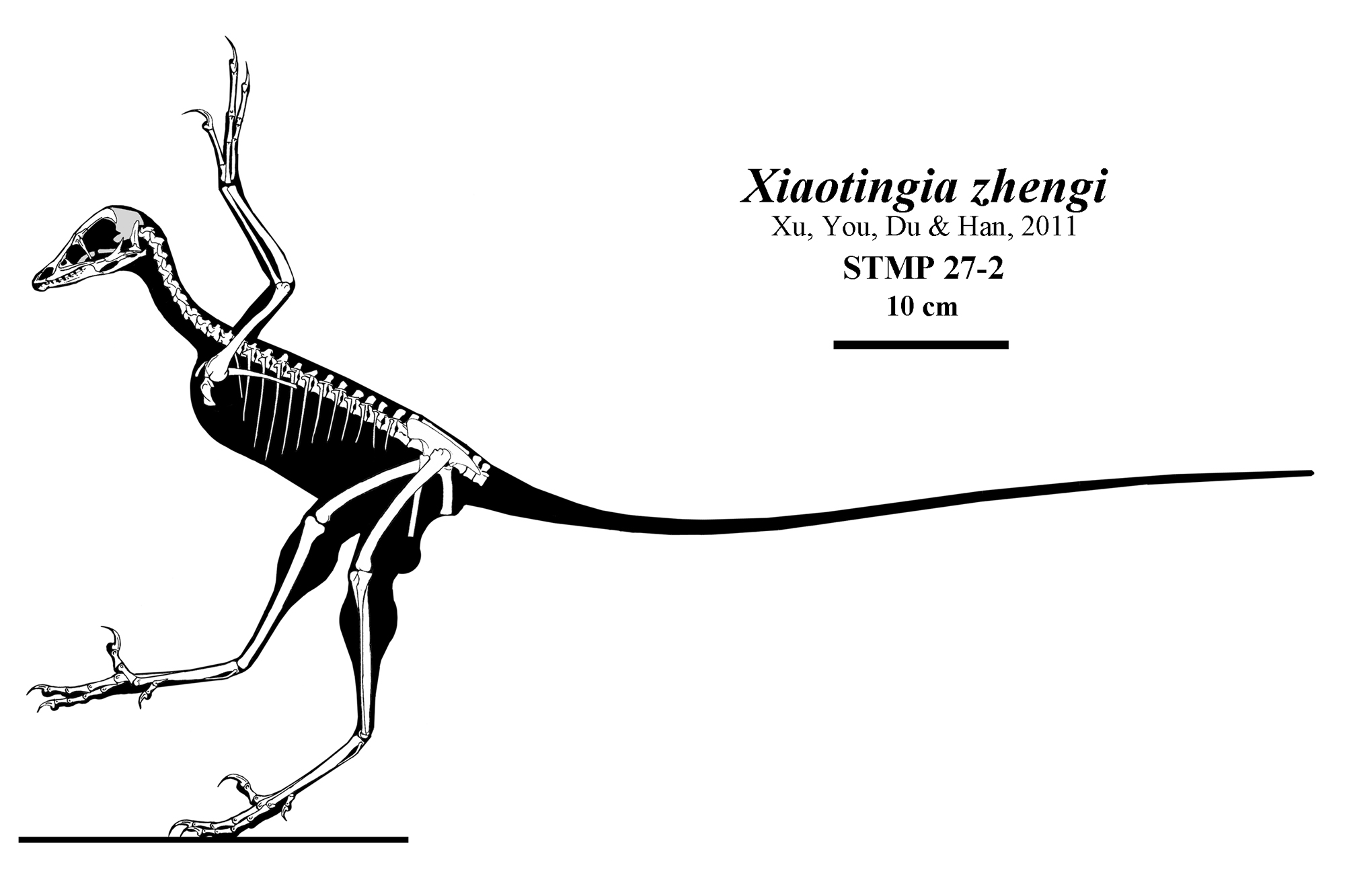
Skeletal restoration

Cladogram following the results of a phylogenetic study by Lefèvre et al., 2017.

- Pennaraptora
  - †Oviraptorosauria
  - Paraves
    - - †Scansoriopterygidae
      - - †Xiaotingia
        - †Yixianosaurus
    - - - - †Pedopenna
          - †Aurornis
        - - †Serikornis
          - †Eosinopteryx
      - - †Anchiornis
        - Eumaniraptora
          - Deinonychosauria
            - †Troodontidae
            - †Dromaeosauridae
          - Avialae
            - †Archaeopteryx
            - - †Rahonavis
              - - †Balaur
                - - †Jeholornithidae
                  - Euavialae

In the 2017 re-evaluation of the Harlem Archaeopteryx specimen, Xiaotingia was found to be an anchiornithid, with this group being avialan. Hartman et al. (2019), which aimed to improve the state of theropod phylogenetic research, placed both Xiaotingia and Archaeopteryx in Deinonychosauria, the former as a troodontid and the latter a close relative of anchiornithids. Foth et al. (2025) recovered Xiaotingia as a sister taxon of Avialae, but outside anchiornithids.
