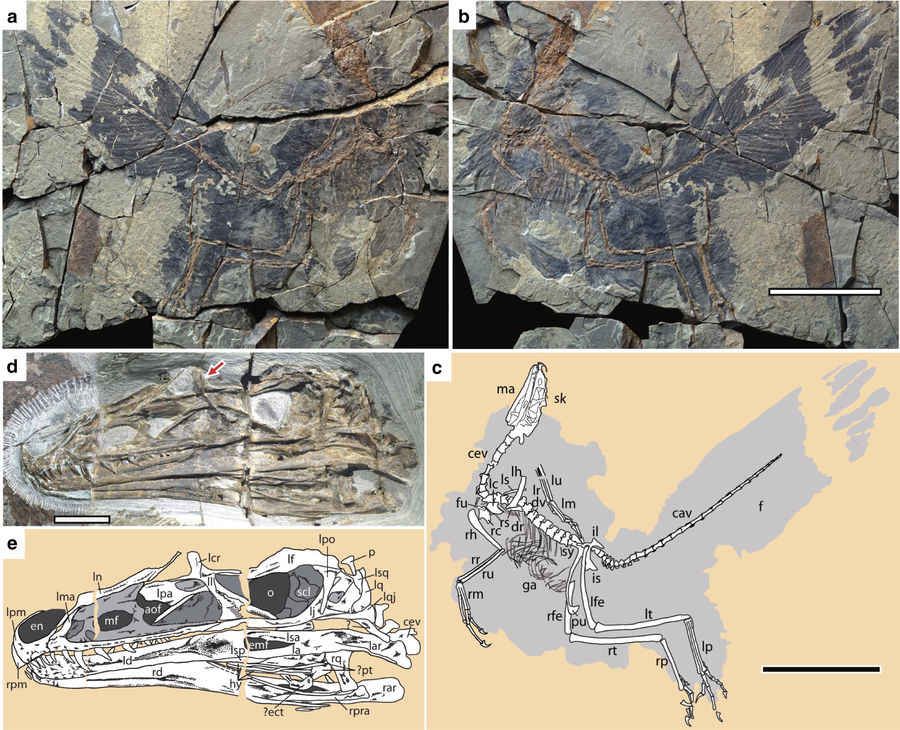
- The holotype of Caihong juji, PMoL-B00175

Scientific classification
- Kingdom: Animalia
- Phylum: Chordata
- Class: Reptilia
- Clade: Dinosauria
- Clade: Saurischia
- Clade: Theropoda
- Family: †Anchiornithidae
- Genus: †Caihong; Hu et al., 2018

Type species
- †Caihong juji Hu et al., 2018

= Caihong =

Caihong Temporal range: Oxfordian ~161 Ma

Extinct genus of dinosaurs

Caihong (Chinese: 彩虹; pinyin: cǎihóng; lit. 'rainbow') is a genus of small paravian theropod dinosaur from China that lived during the Late Jurassic period.

== Discovery and naming ==
At Gangou, Qinglong, in the north of Hebei province, peasant Yang Jun discovered in a quarry near the village of Nanshimenzi the skeleton of a small theropod, belonging to the Yanliao Biota. It was in February 2014 acquired by the Paleontological Museum of Liaoning. The fossil was subsequently, and for the first time, prepared by Ding Xiaoqing and Matthew Brown.

In 2018, the type species Caihong juji was named and described by Hu Dongyu, Julia A. Clarke, Chad M. Eliason, Qiu Rui, Li Quanguo, Matthew D. Shawke, Zhao Cuilin, Liliana D'Alba, Jiang Jinkai and Xu Xing. The generic name is the Mandarin caihong, 彩虹, "rainbow", in reference to the splendor of the fossil and the spectrum of new scientific insights it offers. The specific name is the Chinese ju ji, "big crest", in reference to the large crest on the lacrimal bone of the skull.

The holotype, housed at the Paleontological Museum of Liaoning with the accession number PMoL-B00175, was found in a layer of the Tiaojishan Formation dating to the Oxfordian, about 161 million years old. It consists of a complete articulated skeleton, compressed on a slab and counterslab. Soft tissues and extensive remains of the plumage have been preserved. It represents an adult individual.

== Description ==
=== Size and distinguishing traits ===
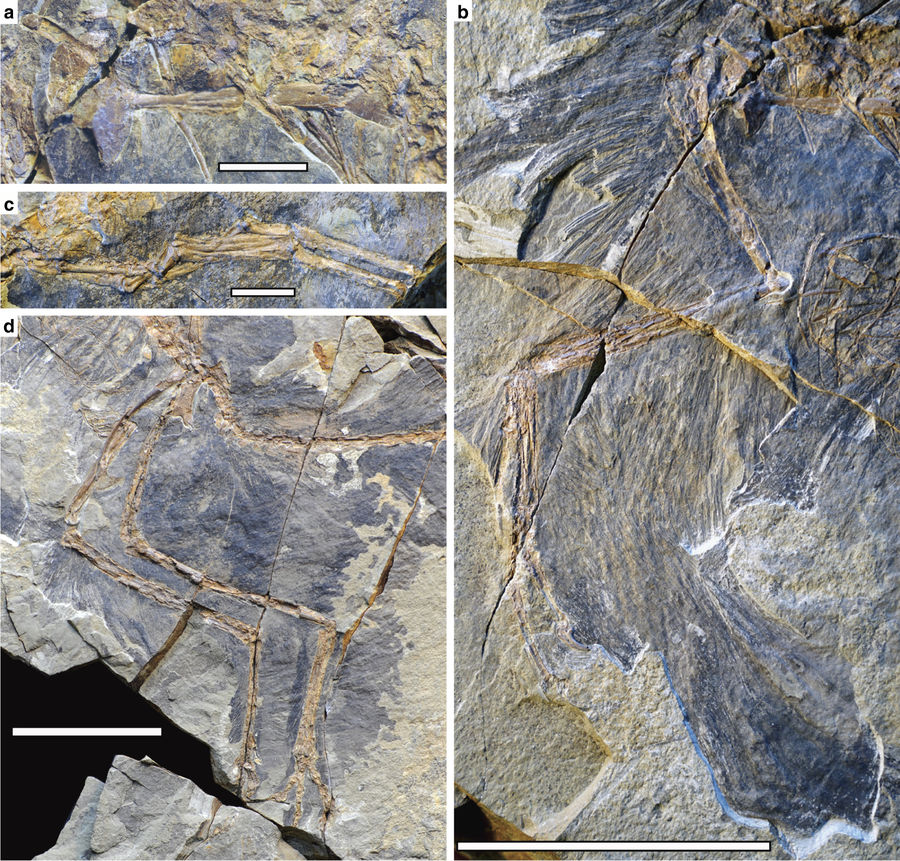
The shoulder girdle and limbs of PMoL-B00175

Caihong was a rather small dinosaur. Its length was estimated at 40 cm (16 inches), and its weight at 475 grams (16.8 oz). It is estimated to have a wingspan of approximately 44 cm (17 in), given that the wingspan is about 2.1 times the wing length which is about 21 cm (8.3 in).

The describing authors indicated a number of unique derived traits, autapomorphies. In addition to the antorbital, maxillary and promaxillary fenestrae (skull openings) present within the antorbital fossa, the maxilla is also pierced by an accessory fenestra which opens behind and below the promaxillary fenestra. The lacrimal bone has a crest strongly projecting to above and sideways. In the lower jaw, the dentary is robust with the front tip higher than the middle section. In the pelvis, the ilium is short with a length less than half that of the femur (thighbone); in all other theropods the ilium is more than half as long. All these traits are unique within the clade Paraves.

Besides, Caihong was especially distinguished from closely related genera of the Yanliao Biota, such as Eosinopteryx and Anchiornis, by the presence of prominent lacrimal crests, longer pennaceous feathers on the forelimbs and hindlimbs and tail feathers with large asymmetrical vanes.

=== Skeleton ===
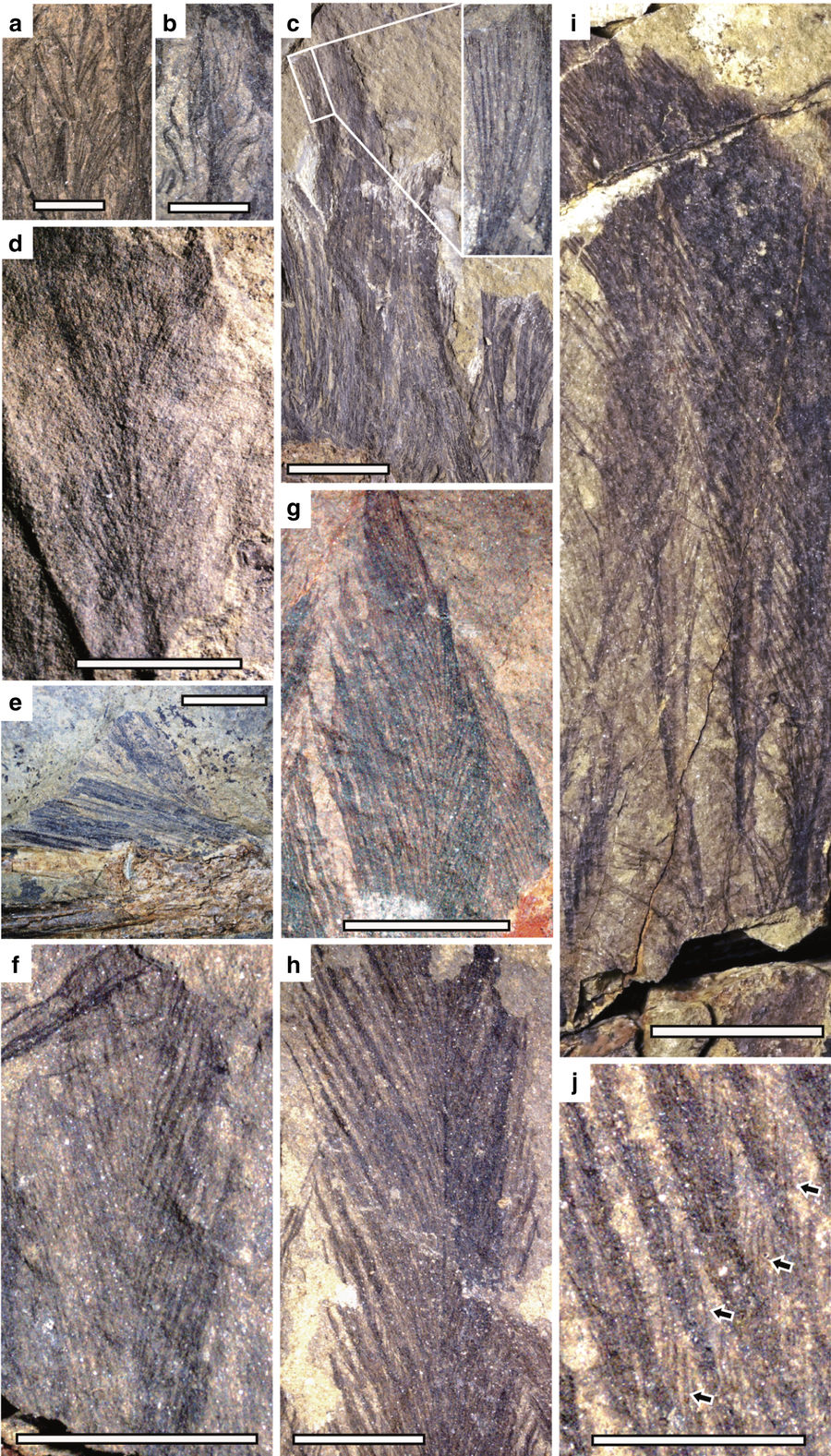
Feathering on different areas of PMoL-B00175

The skull of Caihong has a length of 67.6 millimetres. It is low and elongated (superficially similar to that of Velociraptor), only slightly shorter than the femur. The nostril is large and oval-shaped. The elliptical maxillary fenestra, an opening in front of the antorbital fenestra, is large and located in the middle of the antorbital fossa. The antorbital fenestra itself only occupies 40% of the length of this depression. These fenestrae are augmented by a rather large promaxillary fenestra at the front of the antorbital fossa, similar to that of Archaeopteryx, as well as an additional smaller opening (an accessory fenestrae) slightly lower than the promaxillary fenestra, between it and the maxillary fenestra. The strut separating the maxillary fenestra from the antorbital fenestra is pierced by a connecting channel, a typical troödontid trait. The eye socket is longer than high. In front of this orbit, the lacrimal bone has a long and robust horn-like process, oriented sideways at its base and gradually curving upwards at its tip.

The generally recurved teeth are more slender and tightly packed in the front of the jaws, such as in the praemaxilla and the anterior part of the dentary in the lower jaw. Further back the teeth become larger and widely spaced. The tooth row in the upper jaw is exceptionally long, reaching to a position below the front of the eye socket. The front teeth, including the first maxillary teeth, do not have serrations. Teeth in the middle of the dentary are more strongly recurved and possess serrated rear edges. At the rear of the dentary, the teeth are short and stout with serrations on both, mesial and distal, edges.

Caihong probably has ten neck vertebrae, thirteen back vertebrae, five sacral vertebrae and 26 tail vertebrae. The dorsal vertebrae of the back do not possess pleurocoels. The tail is short, with a length of 178 millimetres. The transition to the middle tail, defined as the point behind which transverse processes are completely lacking, is between the seventh and eighth vertebra. Vertebrae more to the rear gradually become more elongated.

The arm is relatively short, equal to 60% of the hindlimb length. Especially the humerus is short, 42.1 millimetres long, with 60% of thighbone length, compared to a ratio of 100% with Anchiornis. The ulna is longer than the upper arm, a trait which in theropods is generally limited to flying birds. The ulna has a length of 47.2 millimetres and is only lightly bowed. In the hand the first metacarpal—applying the traditional numbering in which the three digits are the first, second and third—as well as the first finger are long, the third metacarpal is robust and the third phalanx of the third finger is longer than the first and second phalanges combined, which are all typical troödontid proportions.

In the pelvis, the blade of the ilium is long before the position of the hip joint, but short and slightly curved downwards behind it. The pubic bone is slightly directed to the rear. It ends in a hook-shaped "foot", as with the Unenlagiidae. The ischium has a length of 20.5 millimetres. It is relatively short and wide in side view, forming a flat strap. Its obturator process on the front edge, has a rectangular profile, which is rare among the Coelurosauria: except Anchiornis and Archaeopteryx all other coelurosaurs possess a triangular process.

The hindlimb is very long, 3.1 times as long as the torso. The thighbone is elongated and has a length of 70.9 millimetres. The shinbone is approximately 82 millimetres long. It is fused with the upper ankle bones into a tibiotarsus. The third metatarsal has a length of 49 millimetres and is at the top somewhat pinched by the second and fourth metatarsal. The first toe is relatively short. The second toe bears a small retractable sickle claw.

=== Feathering and coloration ===
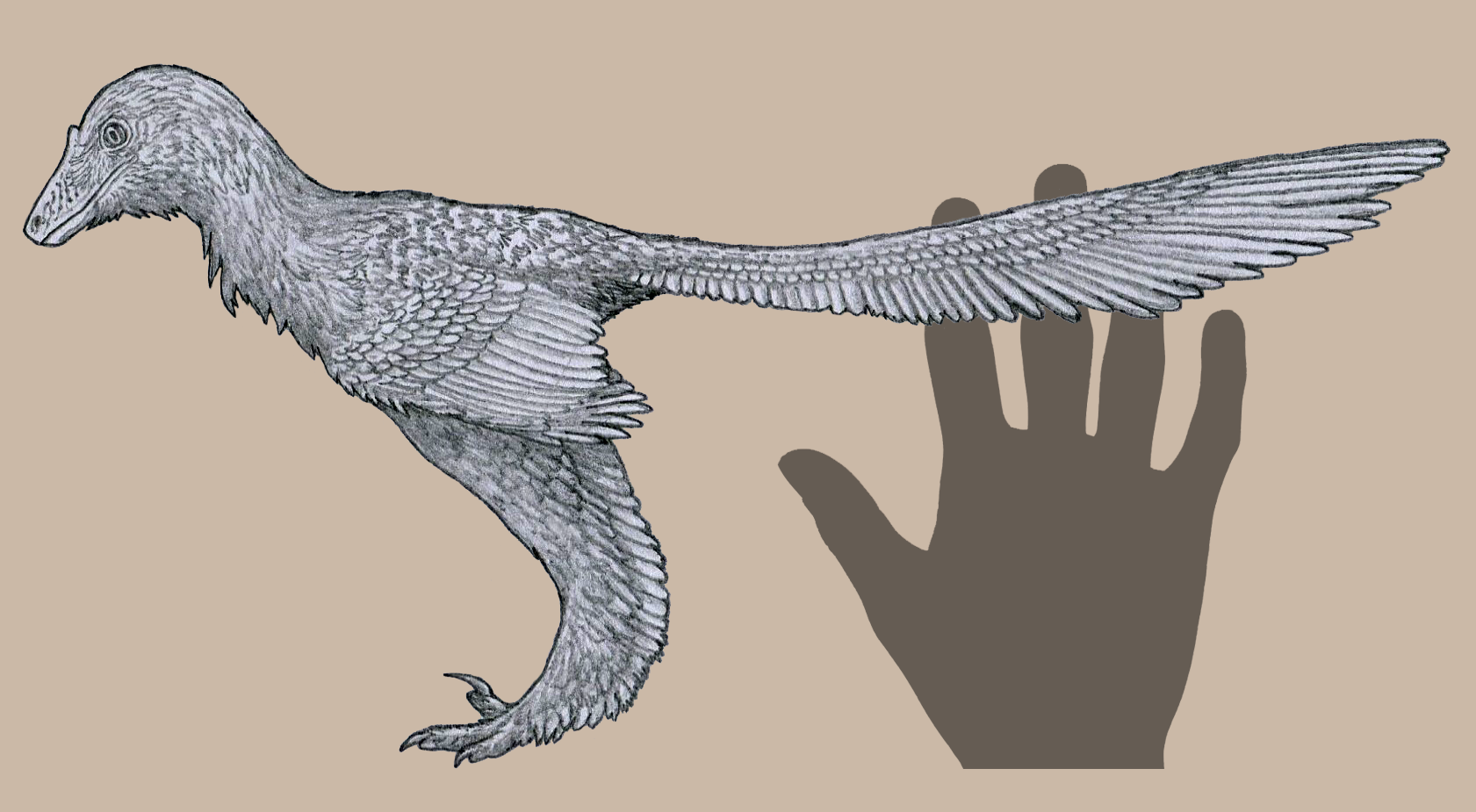
Size comparison and restoration (with crest)

The fossil is surrounded by a wide zone of feathers, only the snout and claws being uncovered. These feathers are not impressions but remains of the original plumage. The splitting of slab and counterslab revealed a complex layering of the plumage. The density of visible shafts and barbs is so extreme that it is difficult to identify individual feathers. The way they are presently preserved may not represent their original condition and position.

The body contour feathers of Caihong are relatively longer than those of other non-avian dinosaurs. Skull and neck show two types of them: the first is stiff, two centimetres long and elongated; the other has a length of one centimetre and is more wavy. On the breast and limbs, four centimetres long feathers are visible with parallel straight and thick barbs. None of these contour feathers could be definitely identified as being pennaceous, with closed vanes.

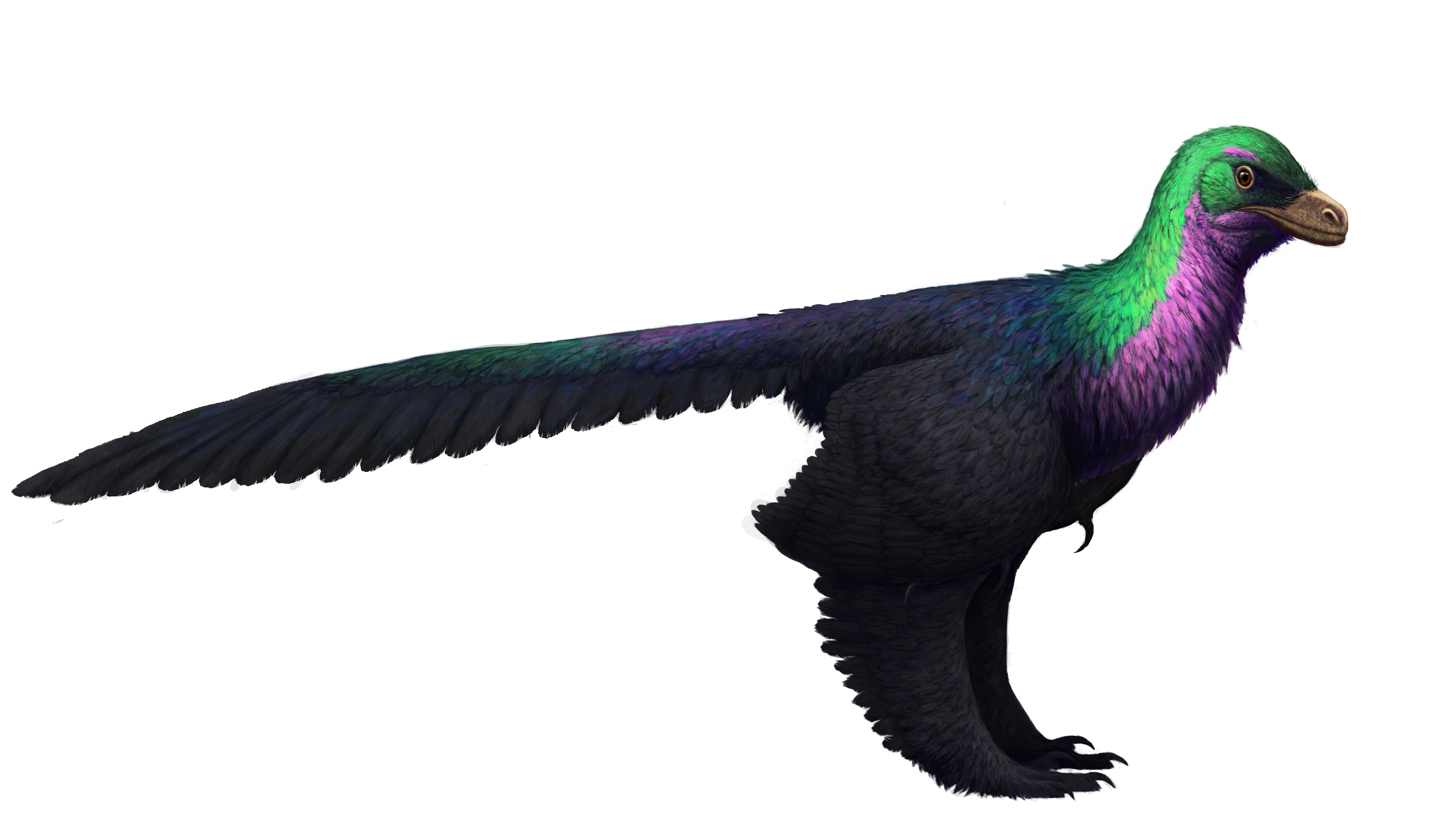
Life restoration of Caihong juji (without crest)

The fossilized feathers of Caihong possessed nanostructures which were analyzed and interpreted as melanosomes, showing similarity to organelles that produce a black iridescent color in extant birds. Other feathers found on the head, chest, and the base of the tail preserve flattened sheets of platelet-like melanosomes very similar in shape to those which create brightly colored iridescent hues in the feathers of modern hummingbirds. However, these structures are seemingly solid and lack air bubbles, and thus are internally more akin to the melanosomes in trumpeters than hummingbirds. Caihong represents the oldest-known evidence of platelet-like melanosomes.

== See also ==
- Dinosaur coloration
- Feathered dinosaur
- 2018 in paleontology
