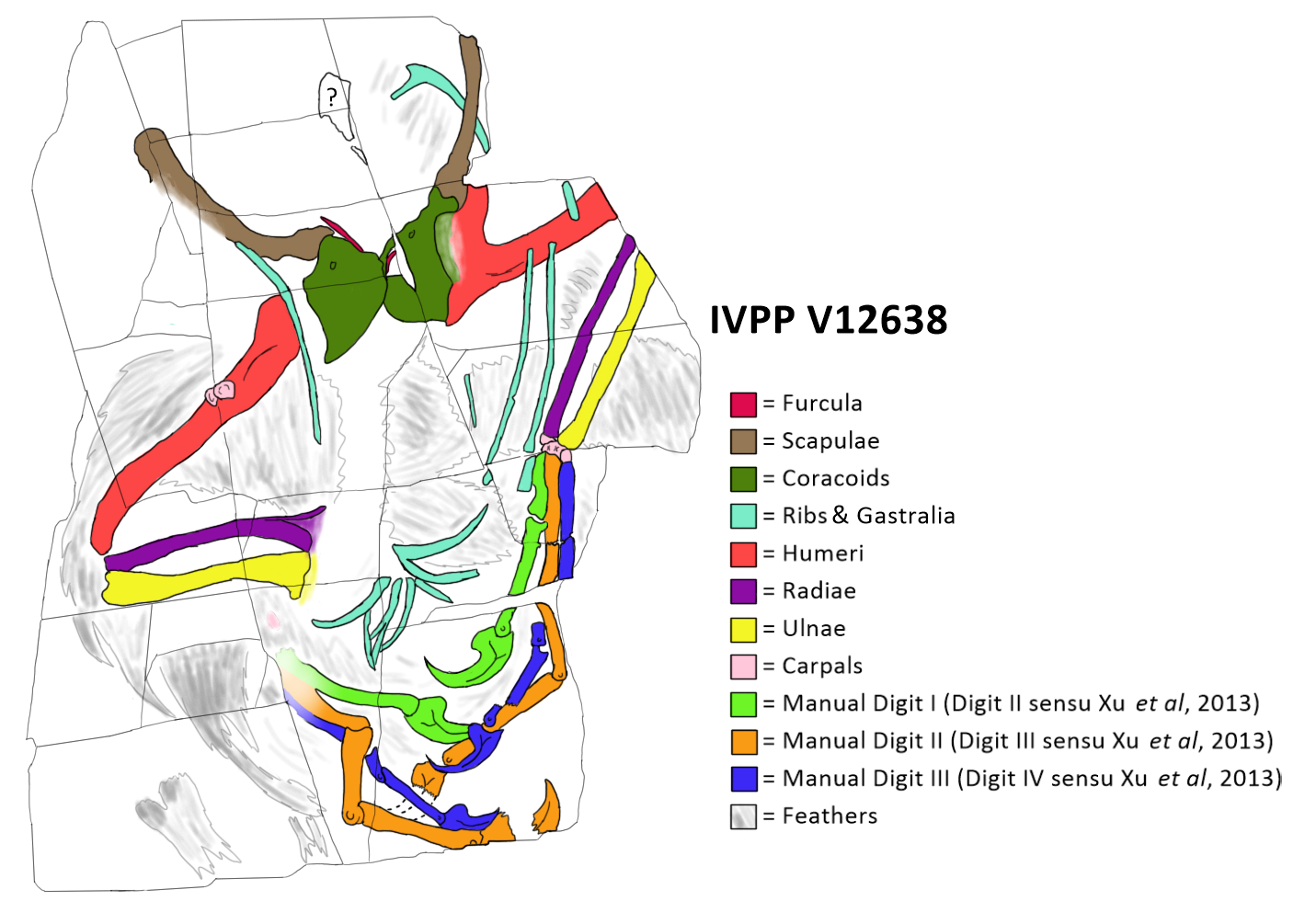
- A diagram of preserved elements of IVPP V12638

Scientific classification
- Kingdom: Animalia
- Phylum: Chordata
- Class: Reptilia
- Clade: Dinosauria
- Clade: Saurischia
- Clade: Theropoda
- Clade: Paraves
- Genus: †Yixianosaurus; Xu & Wang, 2003
- Species: †Y. longimanus

Binomial name
- †Yixianosaurus longimanus Xu & Wang, 2003

= Yixianosaurus =

Yixianosaurus Temporal range: Early Cretaceous, 122 Ma

Extinct genus of dinosaurs

Yixianosaurus (meaning "Yixian lizard") is a maniraptoran theropod dinosaur genus from the Early Cretaceous of China.

The type species, Yixianosaurus longimanus, was formally named and described by Xu Xing and Wang Xiaolin in 2003. Its partial skeleton was discovered in 2001, in Liaoning at Wangjiagou in northeastern China. The generic name refers to the Yixian Formation. The specific name means "with a long hand" from Latin longus, "long", and manus, "hand".

== Description ==
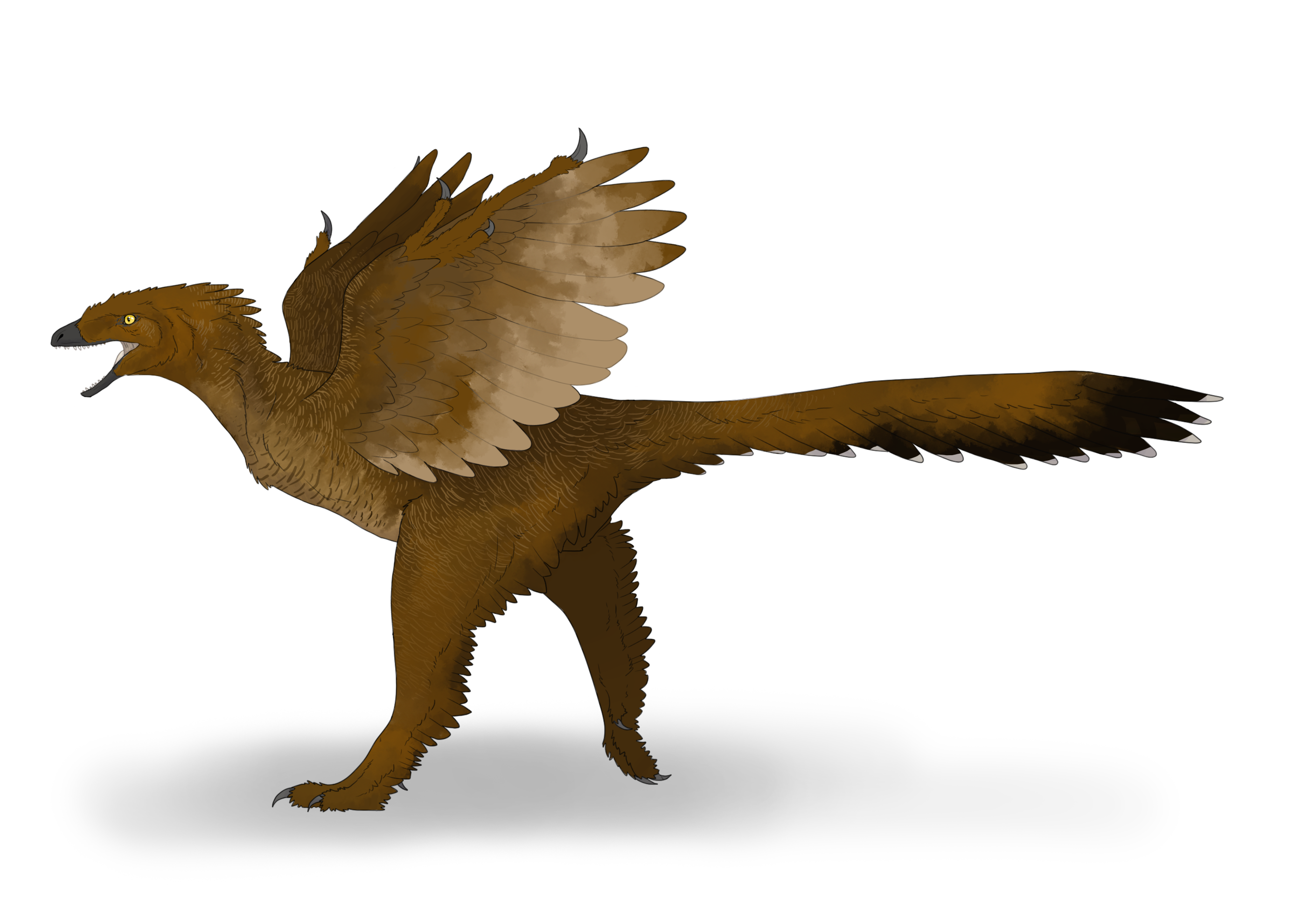
Reconstruction of Yixianosaurus longimanus as an anchiornithid based on IVPP V12638 and fossils of close relatives

Yixianosaurus is known only from a single specimen, holotype IVPP V12638, which likely derived from the Dawangzhangzi Bed (early Aptian stage, 122 million years ago). It is a compression fossil, viewed from behind and preserved on a single slab that has been sawed into several pieces. It consists of the shoulder girdle and a pair of fossilized arms complete with fossilized feathers, some ribs, and gastralia. Yixianosaurus has a very long hand, 140% of the length of the 89 millimetres (3.5 inches) humerus. The second finger is the longest. The fingers bear large and recurved claws. The feathers are not preserved well enough to show a specific structure, but they appear similar to the contour feathers of some Yixian Formation birds. The large hands could have served in catching prey or assisted in climbing. The total body length has been estimated at 1 meter (3.3 feet), the weight at 1 kilogram (2.2 pounds). Xu et al. (2013) suggested that the presence of large pennaceous feathers on parts of the forelimb strongly supports that Yixianosaurus was adapted for limited aerial locomotion.

== Classification ==
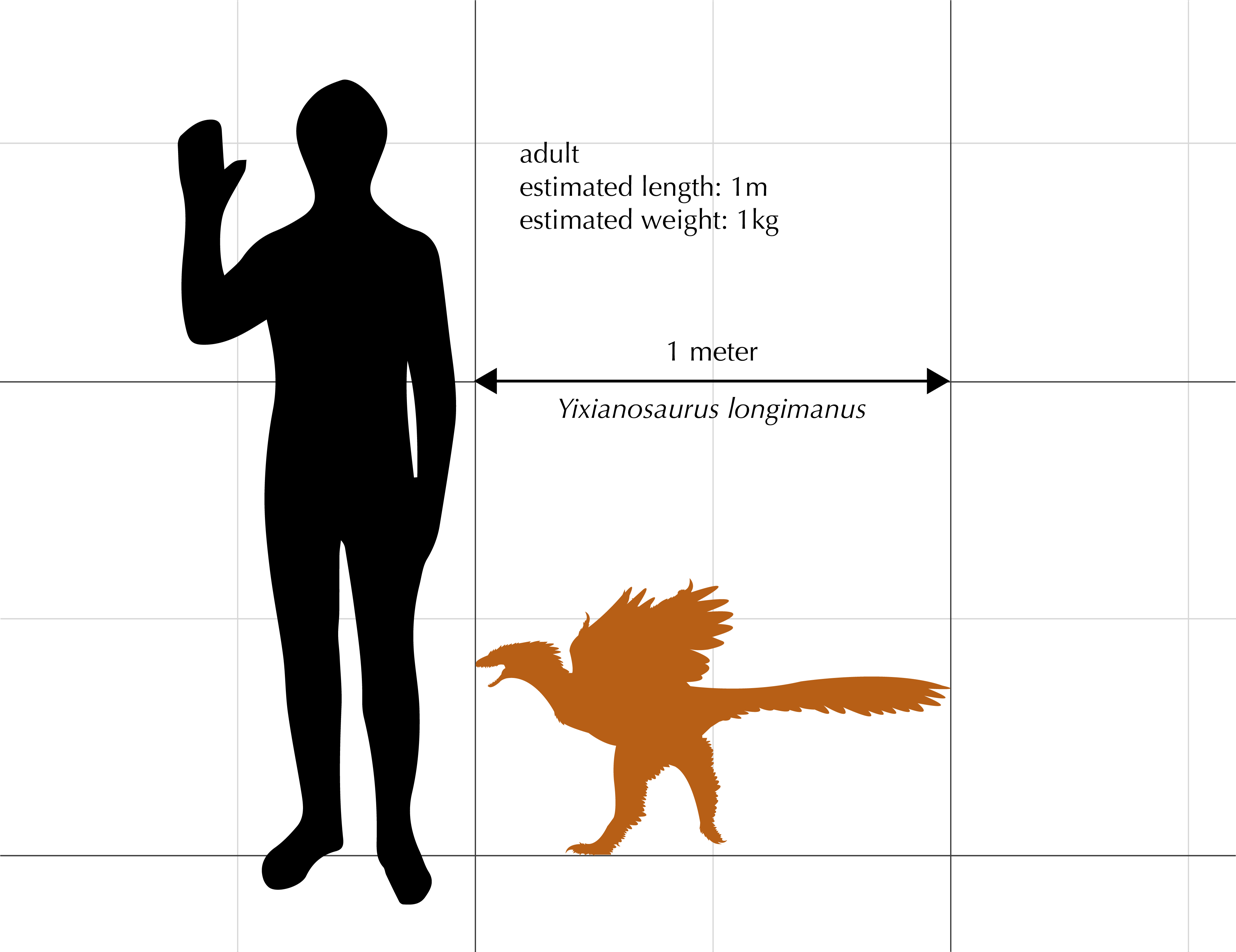
Size comparison between an adult Y. longimanus and the average human adult male

The describers considered the exact placement of Yixianosaurus within Maniraptora to be uncertain, but because the hand length resembled that of another feathered dinosaur, Epidendrosaurus (now Scansoriopteryx), they suggested it was a close relative of the Scansoriopterygidae. Other researchers have suggested the specimen may have come from a dromaeosaurid. Subsequent analyses were divided on whether is it is more primitive and outside the clade Eumaniraptora – this would mean that advanced characteristics such as the long hands and short arms evolved independently in this species – or a basal member of the more advanced Paraves. In a 2017 re-evaluation of the Harlem Archaeopteryx specimen as an anchiornithid called Ostromia, Yixianosaurus is found to be the most basal paravian. However, two other studies published the same year argued that Yixianosaurus was most closely related to Xiaotingia, with both genera being either relatives of scansoriopterygids or anchiornithids. Foth et al. (2025) recovered Yixianosaurus outside anchiornithids, with Alvarezsauroidea as a sister group to Pennaraptora and Yixianosaurus.
