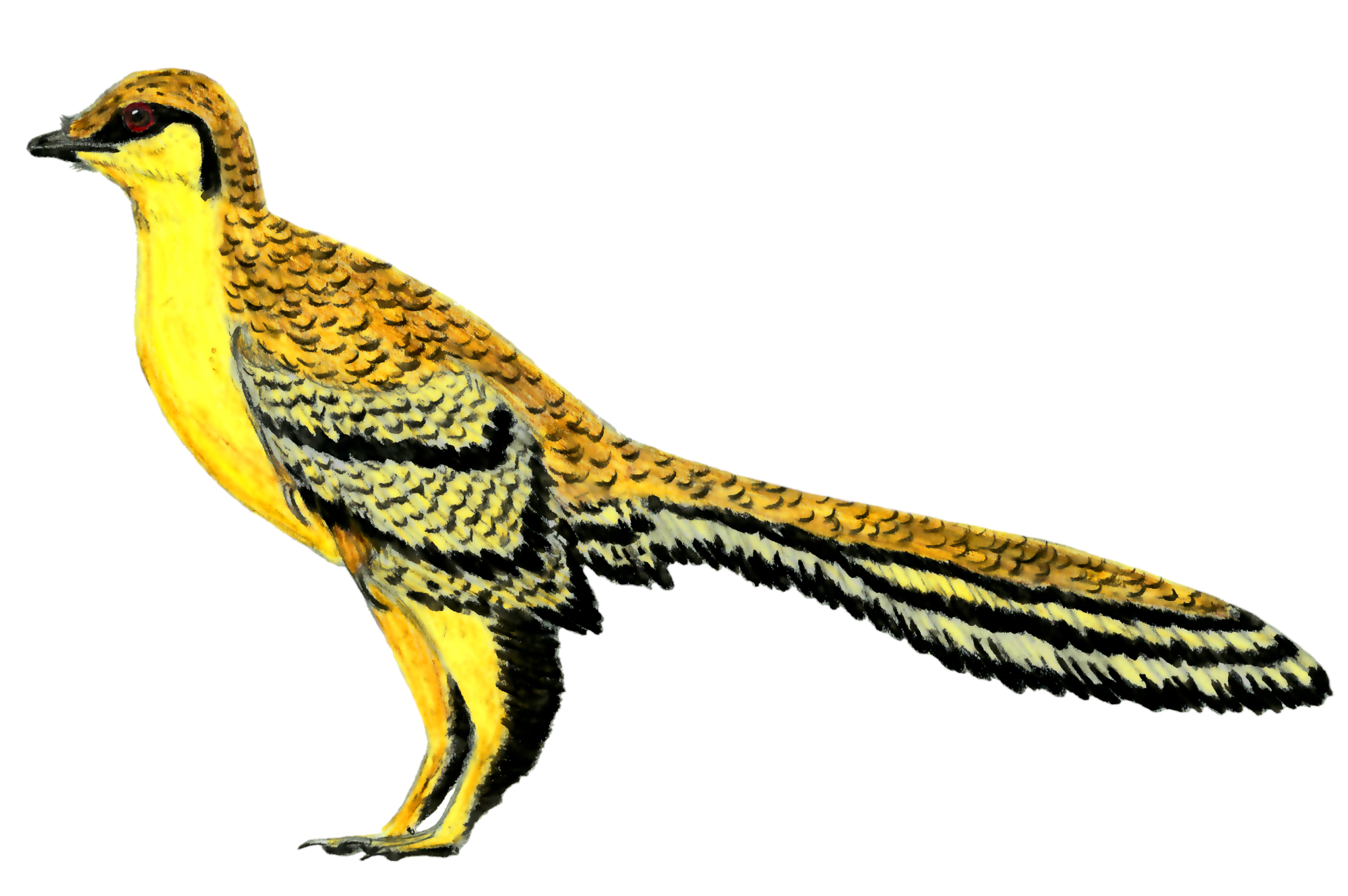
- Life restoration

Scientific classification
- Kingdom: Animalia
- Phylum: Chordata
- Class: Reptilia
- Clade: Dinosauria
- Clade: Saurischia
- Clade: Theropoda
- Family: †Anchiornithidae
- Genus: †Aurornis; Godefroit et al., 2013

Type species
- †Aurornis xui Godefroit et al., 2013

= Aurornis =

Aurornis Temporal range: Late Jurassic, 160 Ma

Extinct genus of dinosaurs

Aurornis is an extinct genus of anchiornithid theropod dinosaurs from the Jurassic Period of China. The genus Aurornis contains a single known species, Aurornis xui (/aʊˈrɔːrnɪs ˈʃuːi/). Aurornis xui may be the most basal ("primitive") avialan dinosaur known to date, and it is one of the earliest avialans found to date. The fossil evidence for the animal pre-dates that of Archaeopteryx lithographica, often considered the earliest bird species, by about 10 million years.

Aurornis xui was first described and named by Pascal Godefroit, Andrea Cau, Hu Dong-Yu, François Escuillié, Wu Wenhao and Gareth Dyke in 2013. The generic name is derived from the Latin word aurora, meaning "daybreak" or "dawn", and the Ancient Greek ὄρνις (órnis) meaning "bird". The specific name, A. xui, honors Xu Xing. A 2017 study of specimens of the avialan Anchiornis has found that the traits exhibited by Aurornis fall within the range of variation in Anchiornis, warranting their synonymization.

== Description ==
Size comparison

Aurornis was roughly the size of a modern pheasant, with a length of 50 cm (20 in). It had clawed wings and a long bony tail. Its leg bones were similar to those of Archaeopteryx, but overall its anatomy was more primitive. Aurornis lived roughly 160 million years ago, roughly 10 million years before Archaeopteryx, which often has been described as the first bird.

== Discovery ==
Aurornis was described from a sedimentary rock fossil in 2013. The fossil was purchased from a local dealer who said it had been unearthed in Yaoluguo in western Liaoning, China. Subsequent analysis confirmed it came from the Tiaojishan Formation, which has been dated to the late Jurassic period (Oxfordian stage), approximately 160 million years ago. The fossil features traces of downy feathers along the animal's tail, chest, and neck. It was only partially prepared at the time of purchase with the feathers not showing, and bore no signs of forgery.

On 7 June 2013, Science Magazine published an article that noted that Pascal Godefroit, the paleontologist who led the team that described Aurornis, reported that he is uncertain if the fossil material came from Liaoning province's 160-million-year-old Tiaojishan Formation, as the information provided by the fossil dealer indicated, or from the province's 125-million-year-old Yixian Formation, which is known to have produced several ancient bird fossils. The failure to secure rigorous provenance information casts doubt on the claim that Aurornis is 160 million years old and predates Archaeopteryx. Godefroit's team will attempt to confirm the specimen's provenance, and its age, by conducting mineralogical and botanical analysis on the shale slab and then publishing their findings.

A 2017 study suggested that Aurornis may be a junior synonym of Anchiornis, a conclusion followed by a different set of researchers two years later.

== Classification ==
A phylogenetic analysis of Aurornis published in 2013 found that it belongs in the bird lineage, in a more basal position than Archaeopteryx. The analysis was based on "almost 1,500 [anatomical] characteristics." On the other hand, a phylogenetic analysis conducted by Brusatte et al. (2014) recovered Aurornis outside Avialae; it was recovered as a troodontid closely related to Anchiornis, Xiaotingia and Eosinopteryx. In 2017 re-evaluation of the Harlem Archaeopteryx specimen, Aurornis is found to be an anchiornithid.

The classification of A. xui as a bird is somewhat contentious, however, due to the various differing definitions of the word "bird". Recent discoveries "[emphasize] how grey the dividing line is between birds and [non-avian] dinosaurs", says Paul Barrett of the Natural History Museum in London. "There's such a gradation in features between them that it's very difficult to tell them apart ... [Aurornis xui] is certainly an older member of the bird lineage than Archaeopteryx, and it's fair to call it a very primitive bird. But what you call a bird comes down to what you call a bird, and a lot of definitions depend on Archaeopteryx." Bird evolution specialist Lawrence Witmer called the new analysis compelling, but said it remains difficult to distinguish birds from birdlike dinosaurs: "All of these little feathered species running and flapping around ... were all very similar."

American paleontologist Luis Chiappe said that A. xui's forelimb is too short for this species to be a true bird. It "is very birdlike, but it is not yet a bird," he concluded.

In his 2002 book Dinosaurs of the Air, Gregory S. Paul tried to conceptually model a "pro-avian". In his view, the direct ancestors of birds cannot have been completely arboreal, because in that case they would probably have used membranes to fly. He thought they must have represented an intermediate ecological stage, in which the hindlimbs still had largely cursorial adaptations whereas the arms had been elongated in order to climb. Feathers, originally serving the insulation of an already warm-blooded animal, would by elongation have turned the arms into wings in order to fly. More generally, the proavians would, in view of their basal theropod forebears and bird descendants, have been typified by long necks, a short trunk, long fingers with opposable digits, a decoupling of the locomotor functions of the forelimbs and hindlimbs, a lack of a propatagium, a shallow tail, and a weight of about one kilogramme. Paul illustrated his analysis with a skeletal diagram, accompanied by a life illustration of a "proavis". When Aurornis was described in 2013, it was at the time the most basal known member of the Avialae, the group consisting of birds and their closest relatives. The Italian paleontologist Andrea Cau remarked it bore an uncanny resemblance to Paul's "proavis".
