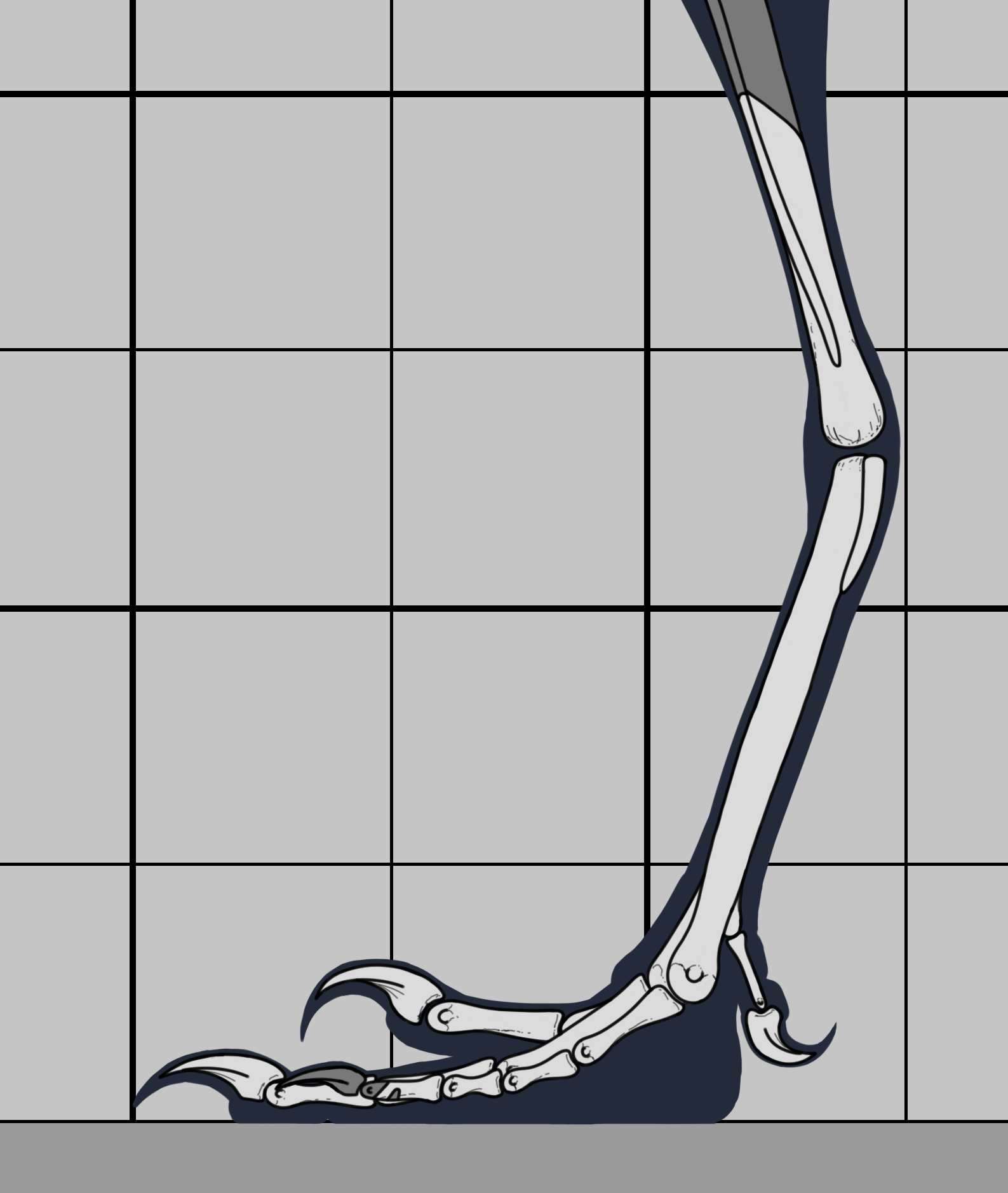
- Skeletal diagram of all known material

Scientific classification
- Kingdom: Animalia
- Phylum: Chordata
- Class: Reptilia
- Clade: Dinosauria
- Clade: Saurischia
- Clade: Theropoda
- Clade: Paraves
- Family: †Anchiornithidae
- Genus: †Pedopenna; Xu & Zhang, 2005
- Species: †P. daohugouensis

Binomial name
- †Pedopenna daohugouensis Xu & Zhang, 2005

= Pedopenna =

Pedopenna Temporal range: Late Jurassic, 164 Ma

Extinct genus of dinosaurs

Pedopenna (/ˌpɛdoʊˈpɛnə/) (meaning "foot feather") is a genus of small, feathered, maniraptoran dinosaur from the Daohugou Beds in China. It is possibly older than Archaeopteryx, though the age of the Daohugou Beds where it was found is debated. A majority of studies suggest that the beds probably date from between the late Middle Jurassic (168 million years ago) and early Late Jurassic Period (164-152 million years ago).

The name Pedopenna refers to the long pennaceous feathers on the metatarsus; daohugouensis refers to the locality of Daohugou, where the holotype was found. Pedopenna daohugouensis probably measured 1 meter (3 ft) or less in length, but since this species is only known from the hind legs, the actual length is difficult to estimate. Pedopenna was originally classified as a paravian, the group of maniraptoran dinosaurs that includes both deinonychosaurs and avialans (the lineage including modern birds), but some scientists have classified it as a true avialan more closely related to modern birds than to deinonychosaurs. More recently, it has been recovered as a scansoriopterygid. The most recent study recovered it within the family Anchiornithidae.

== Description ==
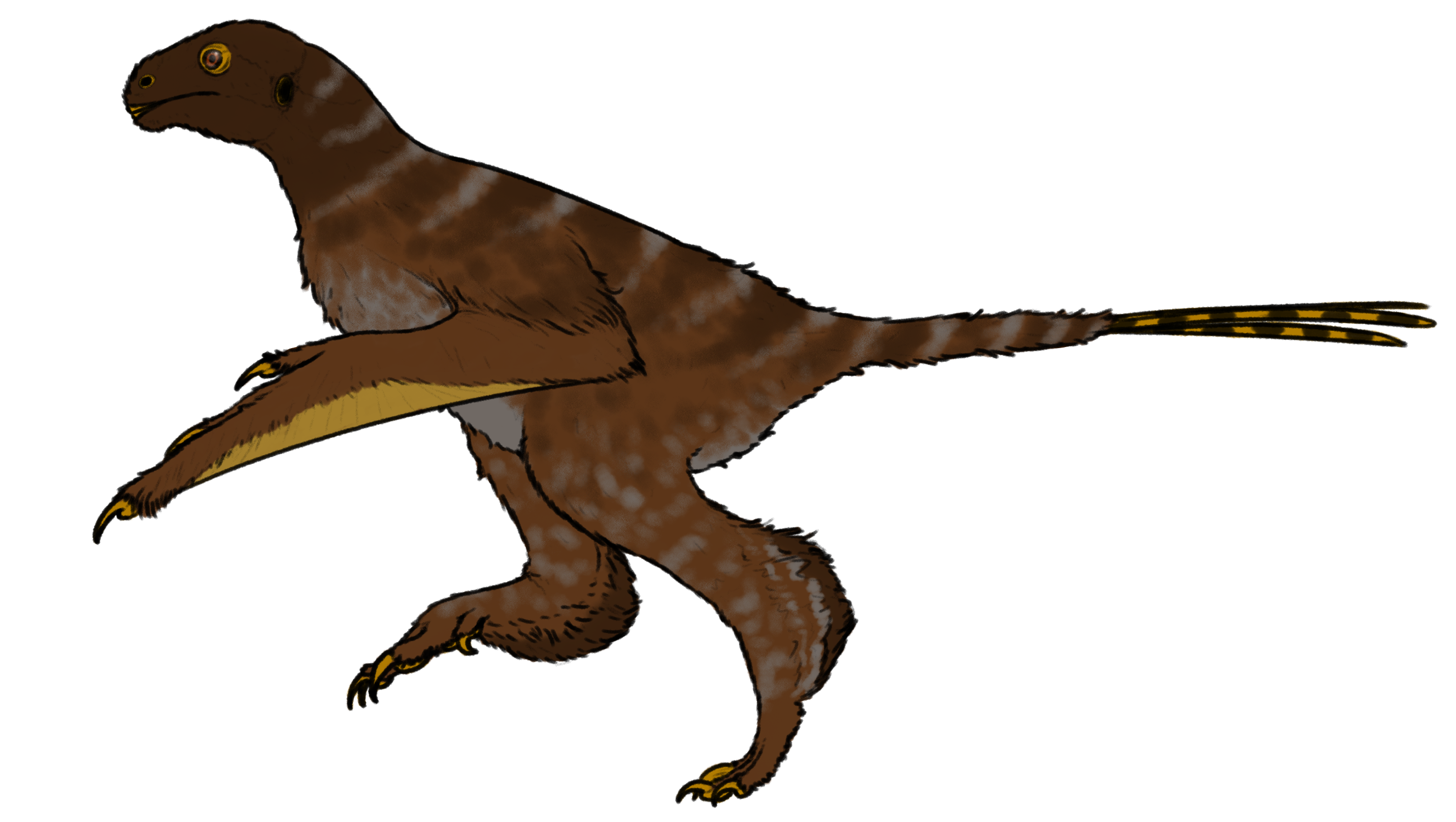
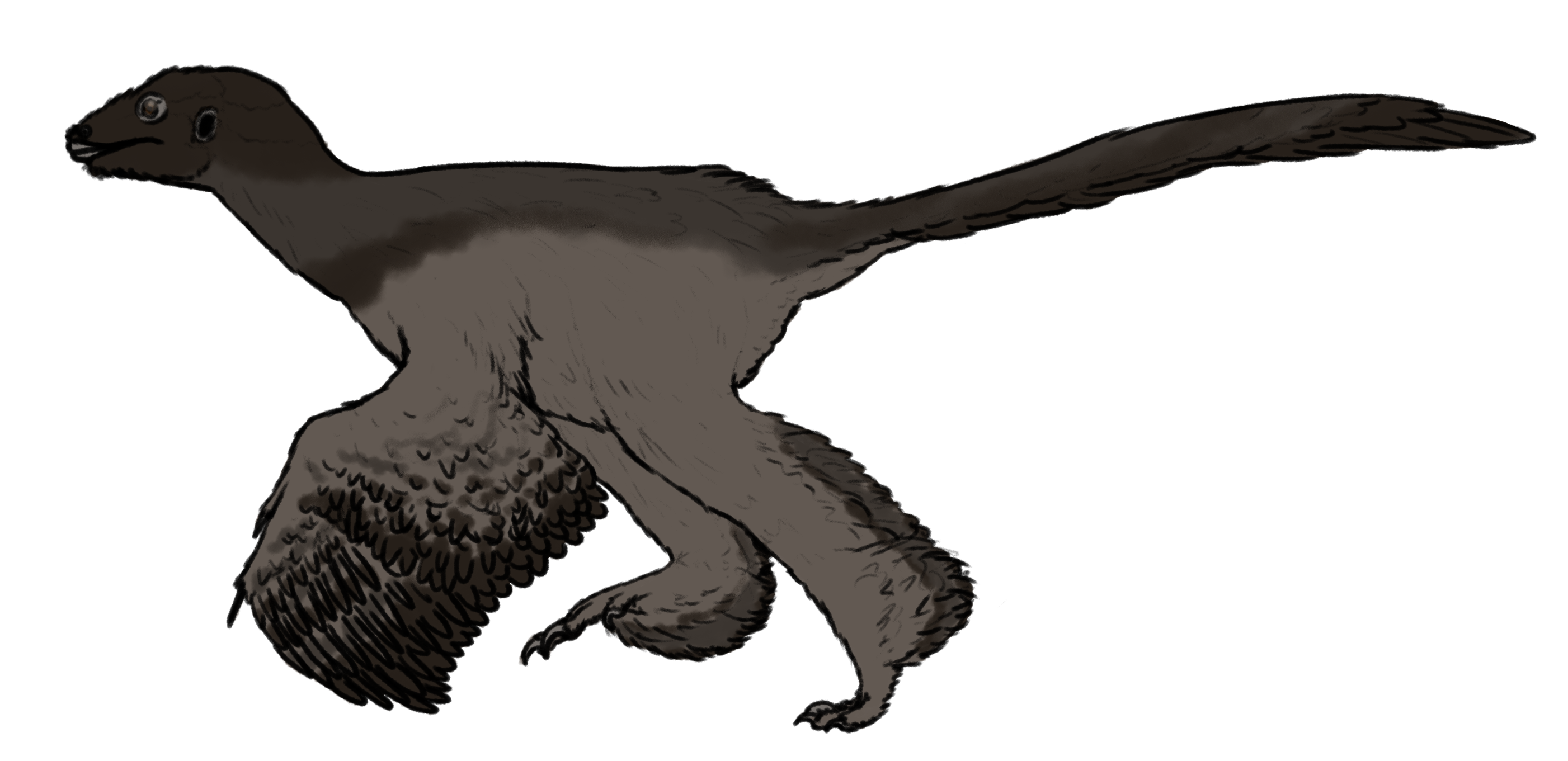
Two speculative life reconstructions of Pedopenna: left is as a scansoriopterygid per Hartman et al. (2019), right is as an anchiornithid per Lefèvre et al. (2020).

The feet of Pedopenna resembled those of the related troodontids and dromaeosaurids (which together form the group Deinonychosauria), though were overall more primitive. In particular, the second toe of Pedopenna was not as specialized as in deinonychosaurs. While Pedopenna did have an enlarged claw and slightly shortened second toe, it was not as highly developed as the strongly curved, sickle-like claws of its relatives.

Xu Xing and Fucheng Zhang, who interpreted the Daohugou fossil beds where Pedopenna was found as mid to late Jurassic in age, used the presence of such a primitive member of the avian lineage, in combination with many primitive members of closely related lineages there, to support the idea that Avialae originated in Asia.

=== Feathers ===
The bird-like characteristics of Pedopenna are further evidence of the dinosaur-bird evolutionary relationship. Apart from having a very bird-like skeletal structure in its legs, Pedopenna was remarkable due to the presence of long pennaceous feathers on the metatarsus (foot). Some deinonychosaurs are also known to have these 'hind wings', but those of Pedopenna differ from those of deinonychosaurs like Microraptor. Pedopenna hind wings were smaller and more rounded in shape. The longest feathers were slightly shorter than the metatarsus, at about 55 mm (2 in) long. Additionally, the feathers of Pedopenna were symmetrical, unlike the asymmetrical feathers of some deinonychosaurs and birds. Since asymmetrical feathers are typical of animals adapted to flying, it is likely that Pedopenna represents an early stage in the development of these structures. While many of the feather impressions in the fossil are weak, it is clear that each possessed a rachis and barbs, and while the exact number of foot feathers is uncertain, they are more numerous than in the hind-wings of Microraptor. Pedopenna also shows evidence of shorter feathers overlying the long foot feathers, evidence for the presence of coverts as seen in modern birds. Since the feathers show fewer aerodynamic adaptations than the similar hind wings of Microraptor, and appear to be less stiff, suggests that if they did have some kind of aerodynamic function, it was much weaker than in deinonychosaurs and birds.

Xu and Zhang, in their 2005 description of Pedopenna, suggested that the feathers could be ornamental, or even vestigial. It is possible that a hind wing was present in the ancestors of deinonychosaurs and birds, and later lost in the bird lineage, with Pedopenna representing an intermediate stage where the hind wings are being reduced from a functional gliding apparatus to a display or insulatory function. This theory may be corroborated by the discovery of Serikornis in 2017, an anchiornithid with soft, symmetrical feathers and filaments on parts of the body that were similar to those of Pedopenna.
