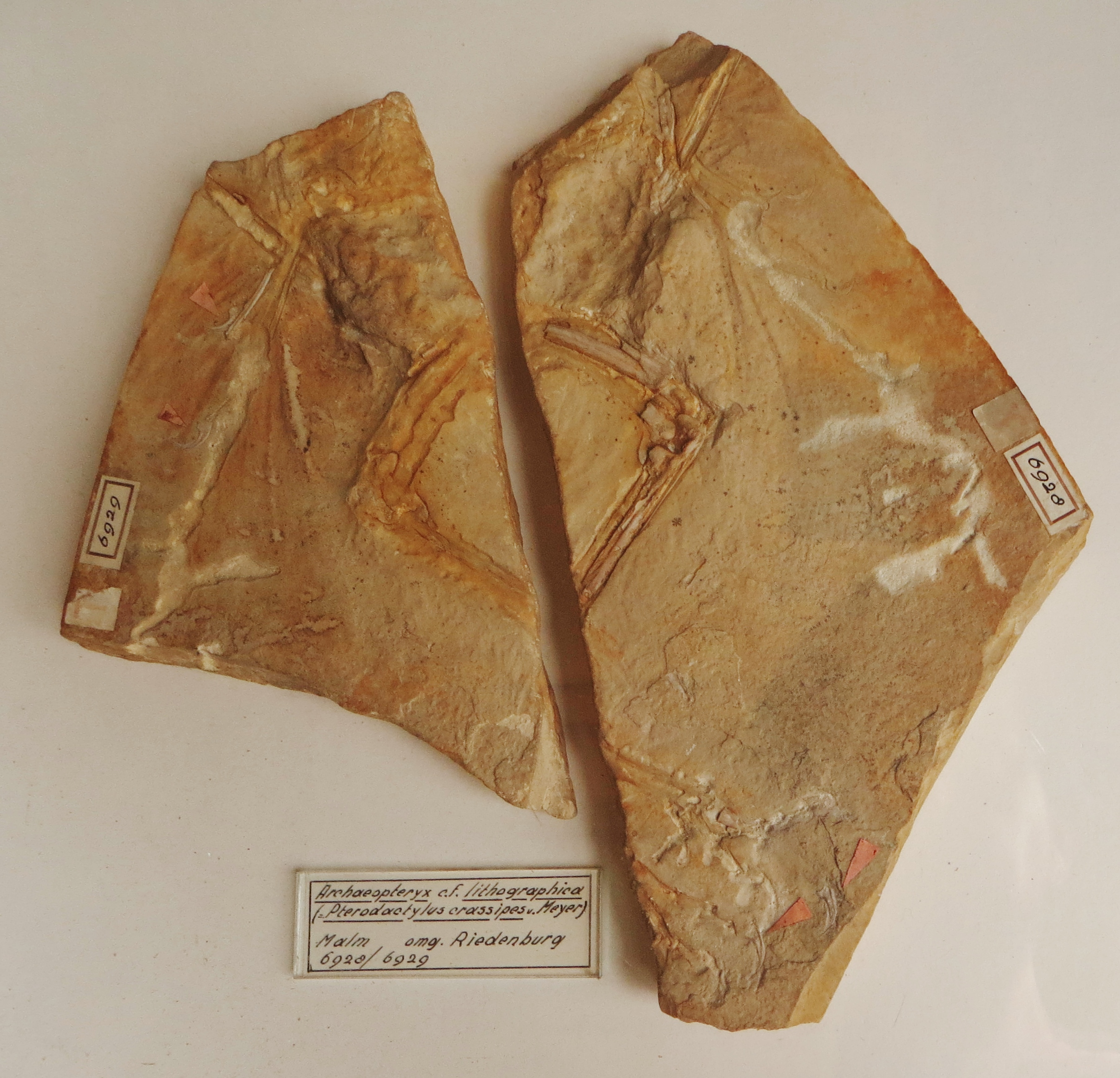
- Slabs of the type and only specimen

Scientific classification
- Kingdom: Animalia
- Phylum: Chordata
- Class: Reptilia
- Clade: Dinosauria
- Clade: Saurischia
- Clade: Theropoda
- Family: †Anchiornithidae
- Genus: †Ostromia; Foth & Rauhut, 2017

Type species
- †Pterodactylus crassipes Meyer, 1857

Species
- †O. crassipes (Meyer, 1857)

Synonyms
- Pterodactylus crassipes Meyer, 1857; Rhamphorhynchus crassipes (Meyer, 1857); Scaphognathus crassipes (Meyer, 1857) Wagner, 1861; Archaeopteryx crassipes (Meyer, 1857) Ostrom, 1970

= Ostromia =

Ostromia Temporal range: Early Tithonian ~150.8–145.5 Ma

Extinct genus of dinosaurs

Ostromia (named after the late vertebrate paleontologist John Ostrom) is a genus of anchiornithid theropod dinosaur containing a single species, Ostromia crassipes. Recovered from the Late Jurassic Painten Formation of Germany, it was named by Christian Foth and Oliver Rauhut in 2017.

== Discovery and naming ==
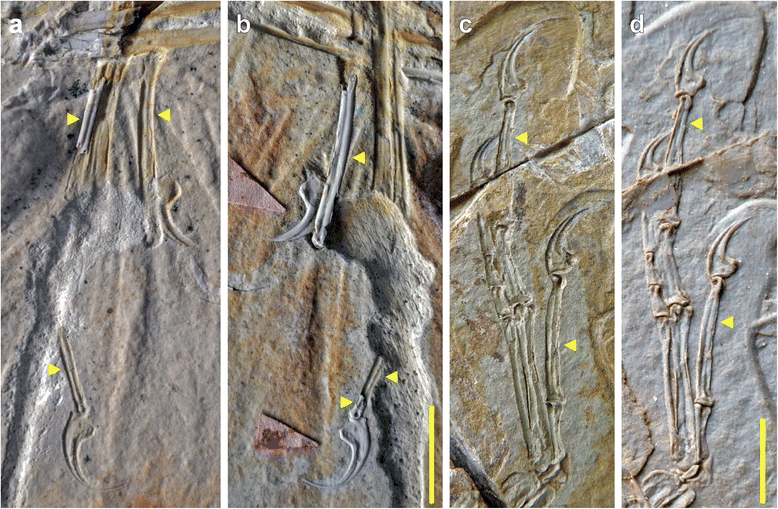
Furrows (yellow arrows) in the hand bones of Ostromia (a,b) and Anchiornis (c,d)

The holotype (Teylers specimens TM 6928 and 6929) was discovered near Riedenburg, Germany in 1855 and it was originally misidentified as a species of a pterodactyloid pterosaur and named Pterodactylus crassipes in 1857. In 1970 it was identified as an Archaeopteryx by paleontologist John Ostrom, who called it the "Haarlem specimen", since it was kept in the Teylers Museum in Haarlem. In 2017 Christian Foth and Oliver Rauhut concluded it was more closely related to the Chinese Anchiornis and introduced the generic name Ostromia, named after Ostrom.

The only known specimen is fairly incomplete compared to most specimens of Archaeopteryx, as it only preserves limb bones, cervical vertebrae and ribs. Most bones are also incomplete, as a result of the poor preservation. A high-quality cast of the holotype is in the collections of the Bayerische Staatssammlung für Paläontologie und Geologie under the specimen number SNSB-BSPG 1971 I 211.

== Description ==
=== Differences from Archaeopteryx ===
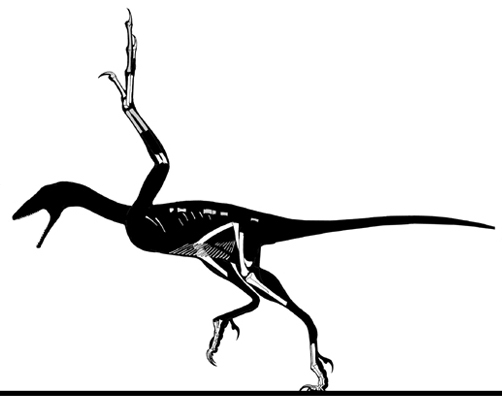
Diagram showing known remains

The Haarlem specimen has many features which contrast with those of Archaeopteryx. The length ratio between the third and the first metacarpal of the hand is larger in Ostromia than in any Archaeopteryx specimen. In addition, the ungual (claw) of the first digit of the hand is smaller than the corresponding first metacarpal, while in Archaeopteryx the claw is larger. The Haarlem specimen's metatarsals are also estimated to be proportionally longer than those of Archaeopteryx specimens.

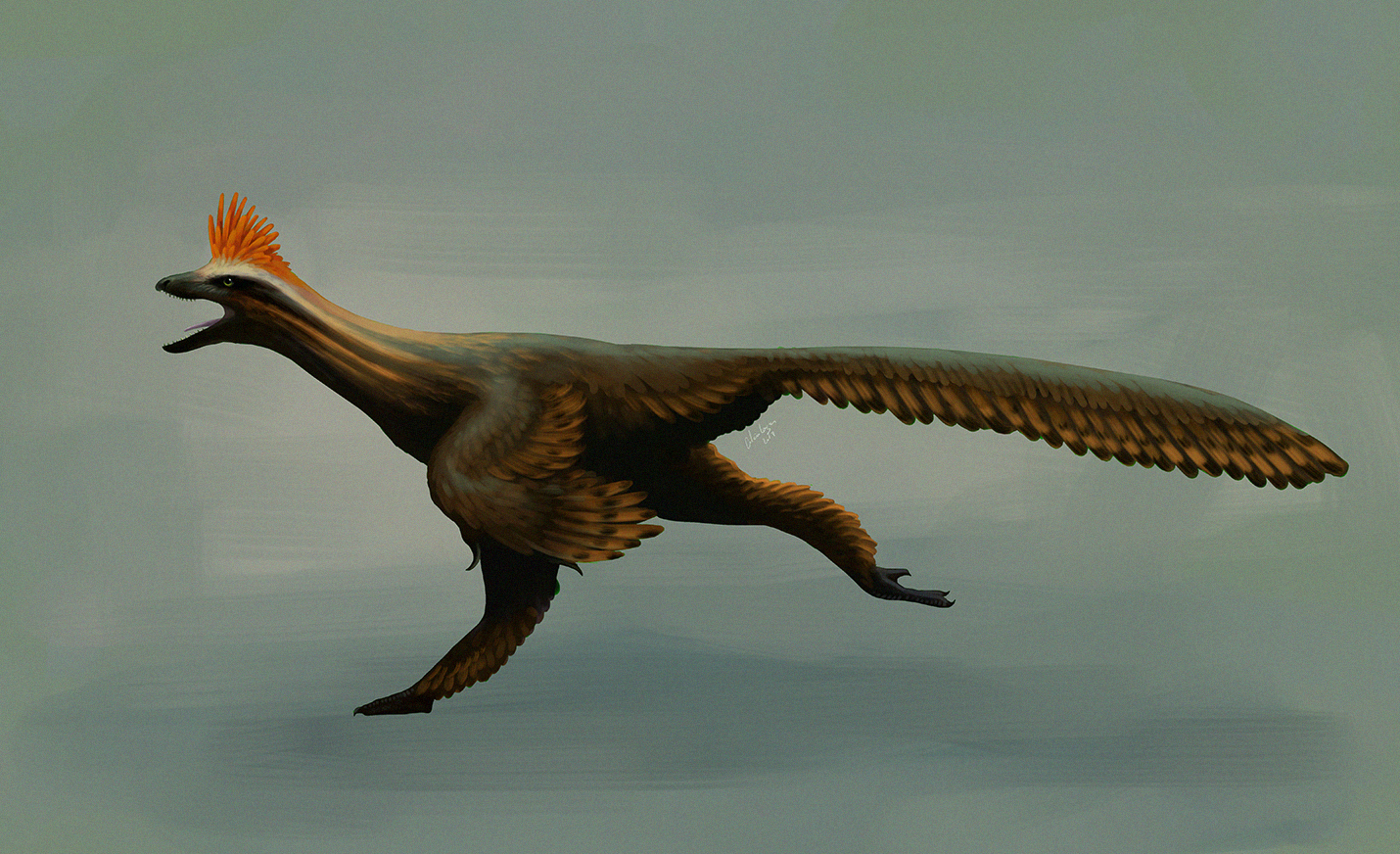
Restoration

In addition, the Haarlem specimen shares several features with Anchiornis. Most notably, they both have longitudinal furrows on the top and bottom sides of their manual phalanges (finger bones). While such structures can be a result of collapsed or broken bones (as is the case in several Archaeopteryx specimens), the straight, smooth edges of the furrows in Ostromia and Anchiornis indicate that they are legitimate biological features. The pubic shaft of the Haarlem specimen is also strongly flexed backwards and has a triangular pubic boot, similar to the pubis of Anchiornis but unlike that of Archaeopteryx.

== Classification ==
Foth and Rauhut (2017) recovered Ostromia within Anchiornithidae as the only known European member of this family. Agnolin et al. (2019) argued that the putative anchiornithid affinities of Ostromia are also seen in Unenlagiinae, and that it is best to consider this genus as an indeterminate paravian. In contrast, Foth et al. (2025) still recovered the same conclusion that Ostromia is an anchiornithid based on their phylogenetic analysis. Other recent work on the genus further discusses its position within Anchiornithidae, including work by Mulder et al. (2024) which hints at micro-CT analysis of the fossil that should provide a definitive solution to its classification.

== See also ==
- 2017 in archosaur paleontology
