= Pennaceous feather =

Non-downy feather with vanes composed of many interlocking barbules

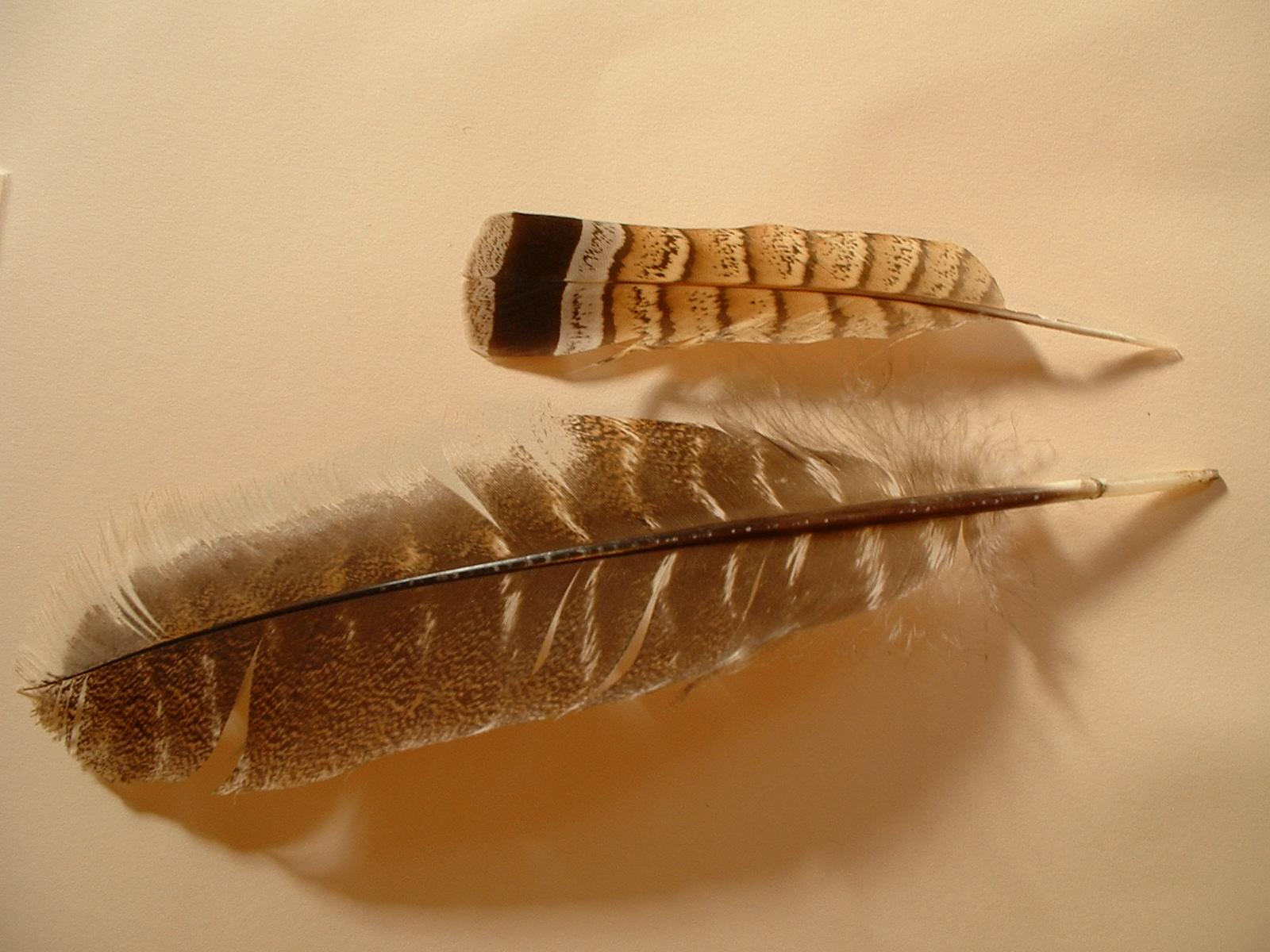
The rectrix and remex seen above are two examples of pennaceous feathers.

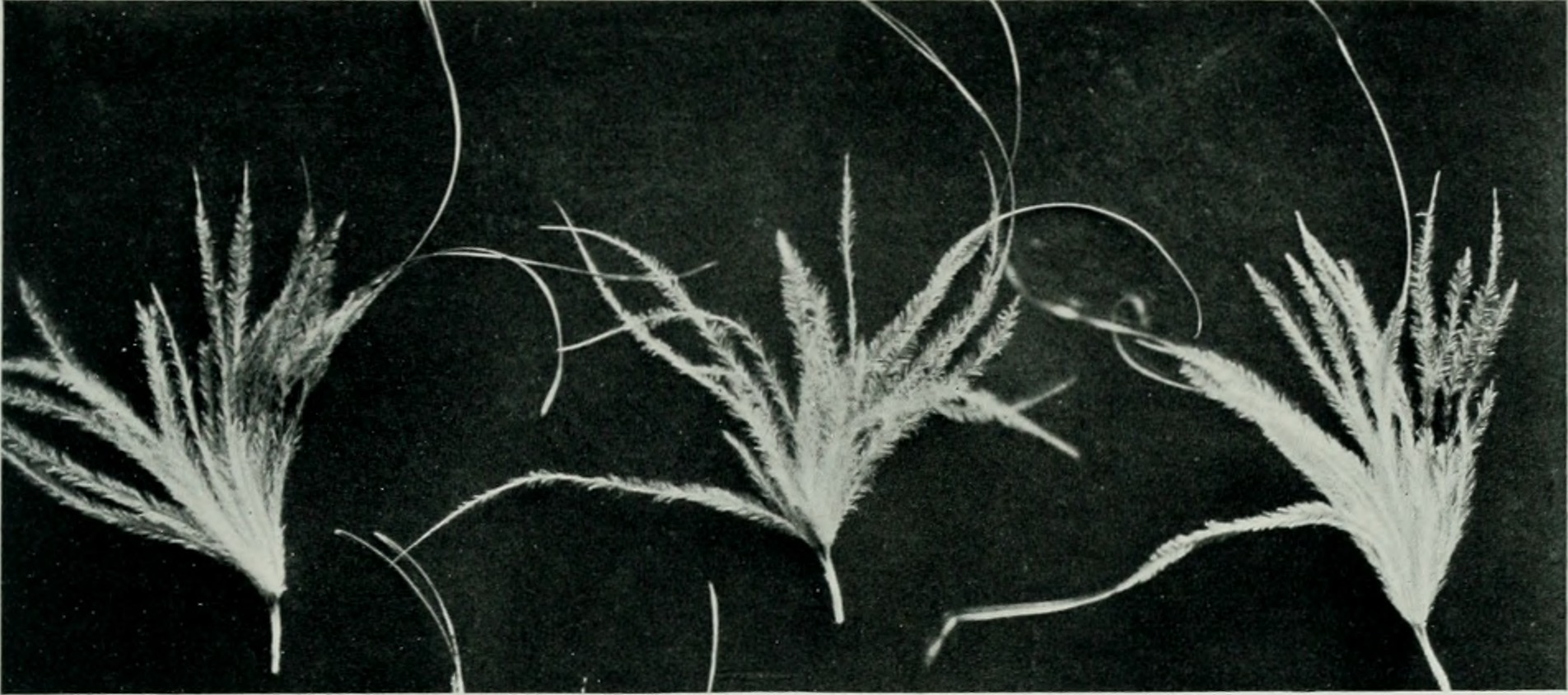
An ostrich down feather is an example of a plumulaceous feather. Its rudimentary rhachis with long flexible barbs and elongate barbules cannot form vanes.

The pennaceous feather is a type of feather present in most modern birds and in some other species of maniraptoriform dinosaurs.

== Description ==
A pennaceous feather has a stalk or quill. Its basal part, called a calamus, is embedded in the skin. The calamus is hollow and has pith formed from the dry remains of the feather pulp, and the calamus opens below by an inferior umbilicus and above by a superior umbilicus. The stalk above the calamus is a solid rachis having an umbilical groove on its underside. Pennaceous feathers have a rachis with vanes or vaxillum spreading to either side. These vanes are composed of a high number of flattened barbs, that are connected to one another with barbules.

The barbules are tiny strands that criss-cross on the flattened sides of the barbs. This forms a miniature velcro-like mesh that holds all the barbs together, stabilizing the vanes.

Pennaceous feathers on the wing, and elsewhere, where stresses related to flight or other activities are high, are accordingly attached especially strongly. This strong attachment is accomplished by ligaments under the skin, which in some birds and other feathered dinosaurs results in raised bumps or marks along the rear forelimb bone (ulna). These bumps, called quill knobs (ulnar papillae), are often used as an indirect indication of strongly-attached forelimb feathers in fossil species, and can also indirectly indicate the number of secondary flight feathers in a given specimen.

Flight feathers (remiges and rectrices) are specialized types of pennaceous feathers, adapted for high loadings and often strongly asymmetric for improved flight performance.

== See also ==
- Pin feather
