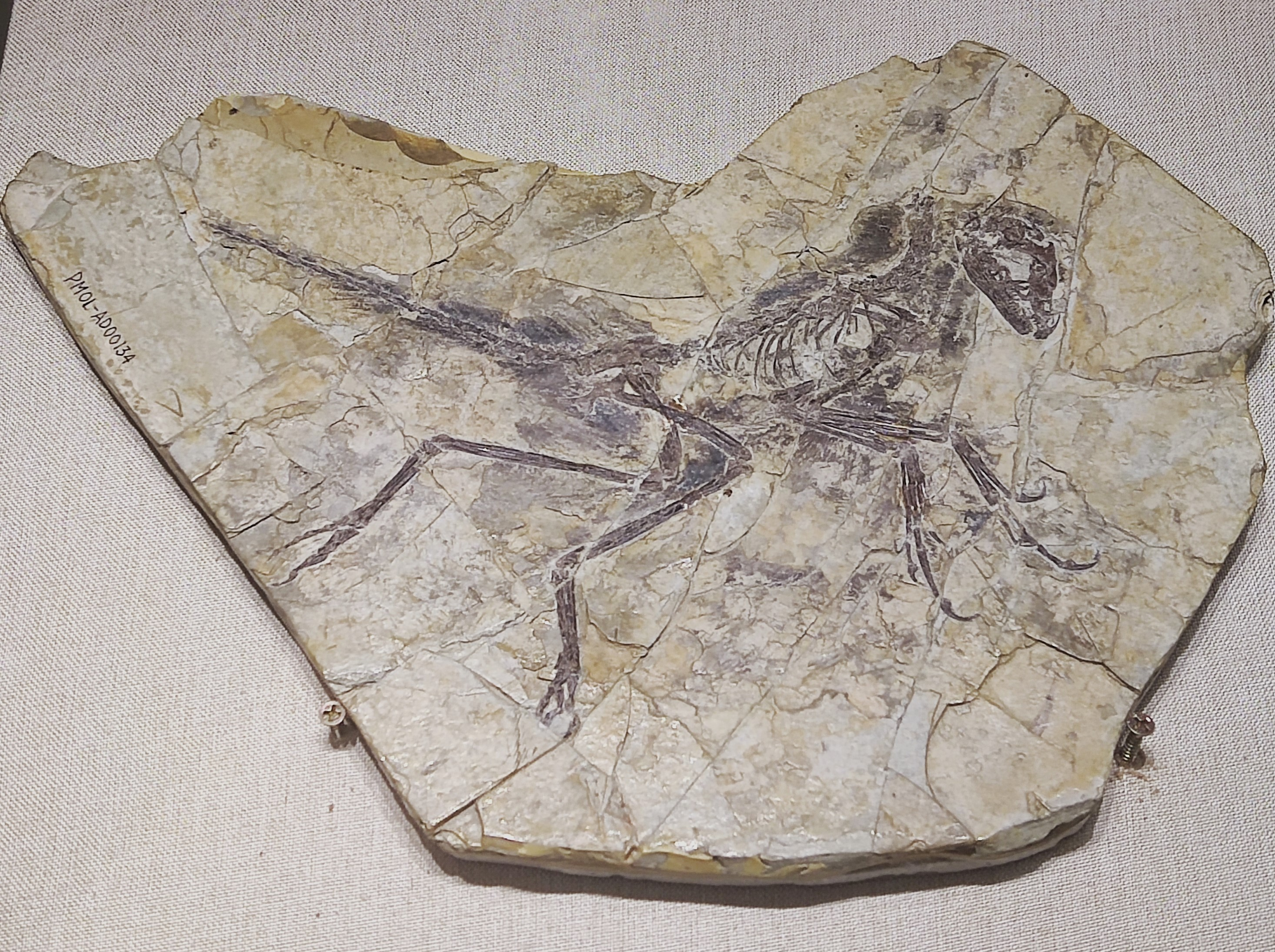
- Fossil in Liaoning Palaeontological Museum

Scientific classification
- Kingdom: Animalia
- Phylum: Chordata
- Class: Reptilia
- Clade: Dinosauria
- Clade: Saurischia
- Clade: Theropoda
- Family: †Anchiornithidae
- Genus: †Eosinopteryx; Godefroit et al., 2013

Type species
- †Eosinopteryx brevipenna Godefroit et al., 2013

= Eosinopteryx =

Eosinopteryx Temporal range: Late Jurassic, 160 Ma

Extinct genus of dinosaurs

Eosinopteryx is an extinct genus of theropod dinosaurs known to the Late Jurassic epoch of China. It contains a single species, Eosinopteryx brevipenna. Some researchers consider it a junior synonym of Anchiornis.

== Discovery and naming ==
E. brevipenna is known from a single fossil specimen recovered from the Tiaojishan Formation of western Liaoning Province, China, which has been dated to the late Jurassic period (Oxfordian age), about 160 million years ago. The name Eosinopteryx is derived from the Greek eos ("daybreak" or "dawn"), the Latin Sinae ("Chinese"), and the Greek pteryx ("feather"). The specific name brevipenna (from the Latin brevis, "short", and penna, "feather") refers to the reduced plumage preserved in the type specimen, YFGP-T5197.

== Description ==
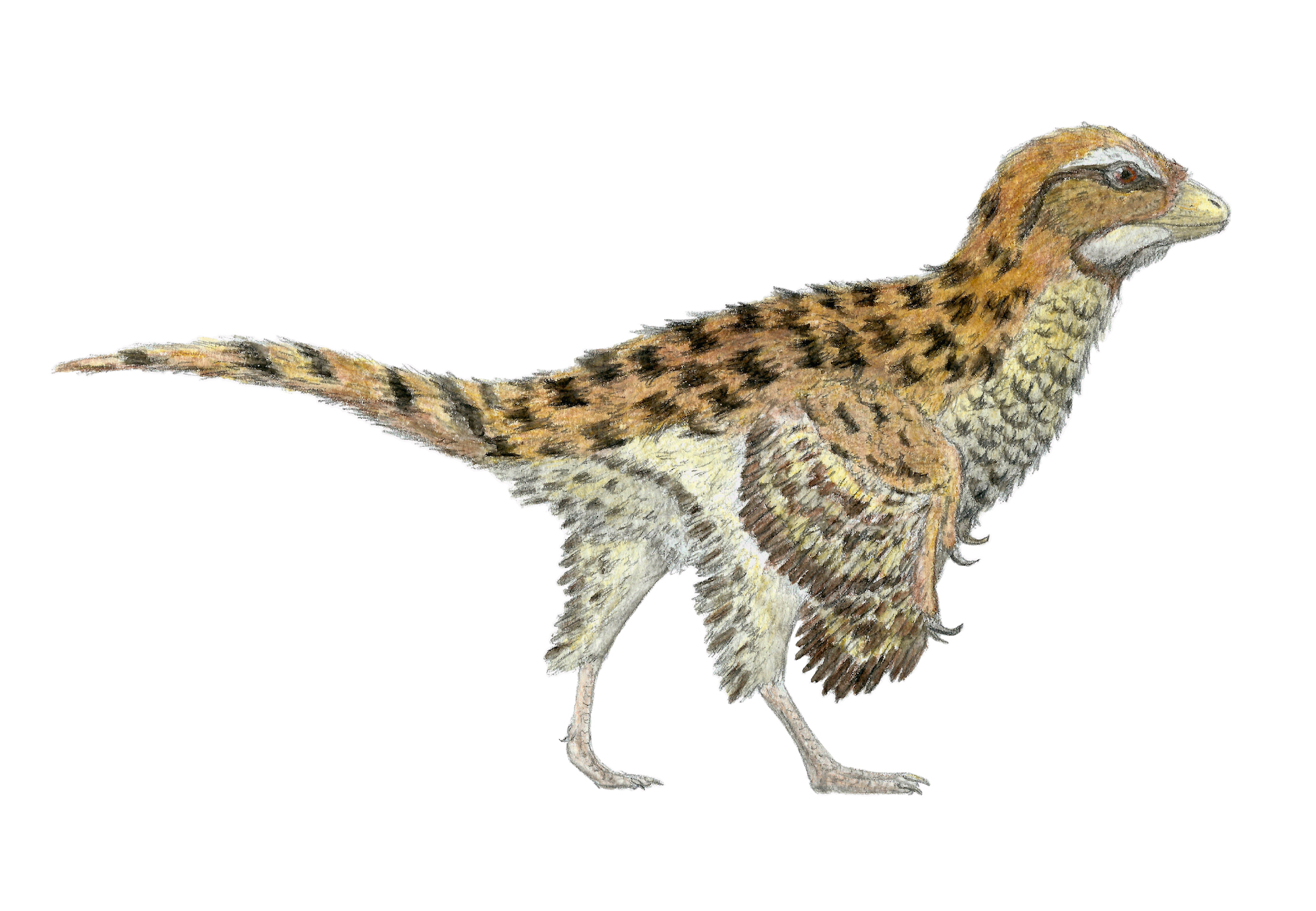
Life restoration

Eosinopteryx brevipenna is known from a single fossil specimen representing the nearly complete skeleton of a subadult or adult individual. The specimen is very small for a non-avialan dinosaur, measuring about 30 centimetres (12 in) long. Unlike most troodontids, the snout was very short, shorter than the diameter of the eye socket. The wings were about the same size as those of the related Anchiornis huxleyi, with the primary wing feathers being longer than the humerus (upper arm bone). An unusual arrangement of the wing bones would have prevented any flapping motion.

The tail was very short compared to most troodontids and dromaeosaurids and also unlike members of those groups, the feet and toes were very slender, lacking highly curved claws for predation or climbing. Unusually, the tail of the only known fossil does not show signs of the presence of complex vaned feathers (rectrices), and the lower tarsals and feet appear to have been featherless, unlike many related species with "hind wings" on the lower legs and feet.

A researcher from the University of Southampton said in 2013 the discovery of Eosinopteryx suggests "that the origin of flight was much more complex than previously thought".

A 2017 study describing new specimens of Anchiornis found Eosinopteryx only distinguishable from Anchiornis in the length of the tail, but the tail of Eosinopteryx is incomplete, rendering this distinction invalid. This led some researchers to consider Eosinopteryx a junior synonym of Anchiornis.

== Classification ==
Though initially classified as a troodontid, a more comprehensive analyses of its relationships have found it to be either a primitive paravian or an avialan. In 2017 re-evaluation of the Haarlem Archaeopteryx specimen, Eosinopteryx is found to be an anchiornithid.
