= Yuezhuornis =

Yuezhuornis Temporal range: Late Jurassic (Kimmeridgian–Tithonian), 150–148 Ma

Scientific classification
- Kingdom: Animalia
- Phylum: Chordata
- Class: Reptilia
- Clade: Dinosauria
- Clade: Saurischia
- Clade: Theropoda
- Clade: Avialae
- Family: †Zhengheornithidae
- Genus: †Yuezhuornis; Xu et al., 2026
- Species: †Y. yangyuanensis

Binomial name
- †Yuezhuornis yangyuanensis Xu et al., 2026

Genus of extinct avialan

Yuezhuornis (lit. 'Yuezhuo bird') is an extinct genus of basal avialan known from the Late Jurassic (Kimmeridgian–Tithonian ages) Nanyuan Formation of China.The genus contains a single species, Yuezhuornis yangyuanensis, known from a partial skeleton and skull. It has significantly shorter arms than its closest relatives—being proportionally more similar to many non-avialan theropods—implying it was incapable of flight. It was a close relative of Zhengheornis, which is known from the same locality.

== Discovery and naming ==
The Yuezhuornis fossil material was discovered during fieldwork in the summer of 2024, in outcrops of the Nanyuan Formation near Yangyuan Village of Zhenghe County, Fujian Province, China. The specimen is housed in the Institute of Vertebrate Paleontology and Paleoanthropology (IVPP), where it is permanently accessioned as specimen IVPP V34427. It consists of a highly compressed, partially articulated incomplete skeleton preserved on a single slab. Known material includes a poorly preserved skull, components of all regions of the vertebral column, and parts of the pectoral girdle, forelimbs, pelvis, and hindlimbs.

In 2026, Xu Liming and colleagues described Yuezhuornis yangyuanensis as a new genus and species of early avialan dinosaur based on these fossil remains, establishing IVPP V34427 as the holotype specimen. The generic name, Yuezhuornis, combines a reference to the Yuezhuo, a mythological bird associated with the fenghuang (Chinese phoenix), with the Greek word ornis, meaning 'bird'. The specific name, yangyuanensis, refers to the discovery of the only known specimen in Yangyuan Village.

== Description ==
The Y. yangyuanensis holotype individual has an estimated body weight of around 821 grams (1.810 lb), derived from a calculation using the width of the femur. Histological analysis suggests it was close to skeletal maturity when it died, belonging to a subadult or adult individual.

Yuezhuornis exhibits a combination of features seen in both non-avialan paravian (i.e., troodontids and dromaeosaurids) and avialan dinosaurs. The teeth in the premaxilla (upper jaw bone at the front of the snout) are tightly packed, more like troodontids and Anchiornis than Archaeopteryx and other avialans, which have widely spaced teeth. These teeth are smaller than those at the front of the maxilla, another feature more like troodontids and dromaeosaurids than early avialans. The teeth in the middle and rear regions of the maxilla are widely spaced, more like Archaeopteryx and other early avialans than troodontids. The teeth in the maxilla are serrated along part of their length, a condition not seen in any other avialan. The lacrimal bone has a much shorter anterior process than posterior process, as in the more derived avialans Jeholornis and some enantiornitheans, but unlike Archaeopteryx and non-avialan dinosaurs, where the opposite is true. The quadratojugal process of the jugal bone is reduced, as in some Cretaceous avialans, but unlike Archaeopteryx, anchiornithids, and non-avialan dinosaurs. The slender, rather than robust, postorbital is also more like early avialans. The dentary (lower tooth-bearing bone) lacks a groove on its lateral surface, a feature that characterizes troodontids, dromaeosaurids, and anchiornithids when present.

The furcula has an obtuse angle, as in Anchiornis and non-avialan paravians. In early avialans, the furcula has an acute angle. Also unlike early avialans, the humerus is shorter than the femur. A longer femur is only seen in some anchiornithids and the flightless euornithean Patagopteryx. The ilium (a pelvic bone) is proportionately much smaller than in non-avialan paravians and later-diverging avialans. The preacetabular process of the ilium is notably longer than the postacetabular process, a condition unique to avialans. Unlike dromaeosaurids and troodontids, but more like early avialans, the foot has a non-arctometatarsal condition. The last non-ungual phalanx of the second pedal (foot) digit is similar in morphology to that of troodontids and dromaeosaurids, indicative of a hyperextensible toe.

== Classification ==
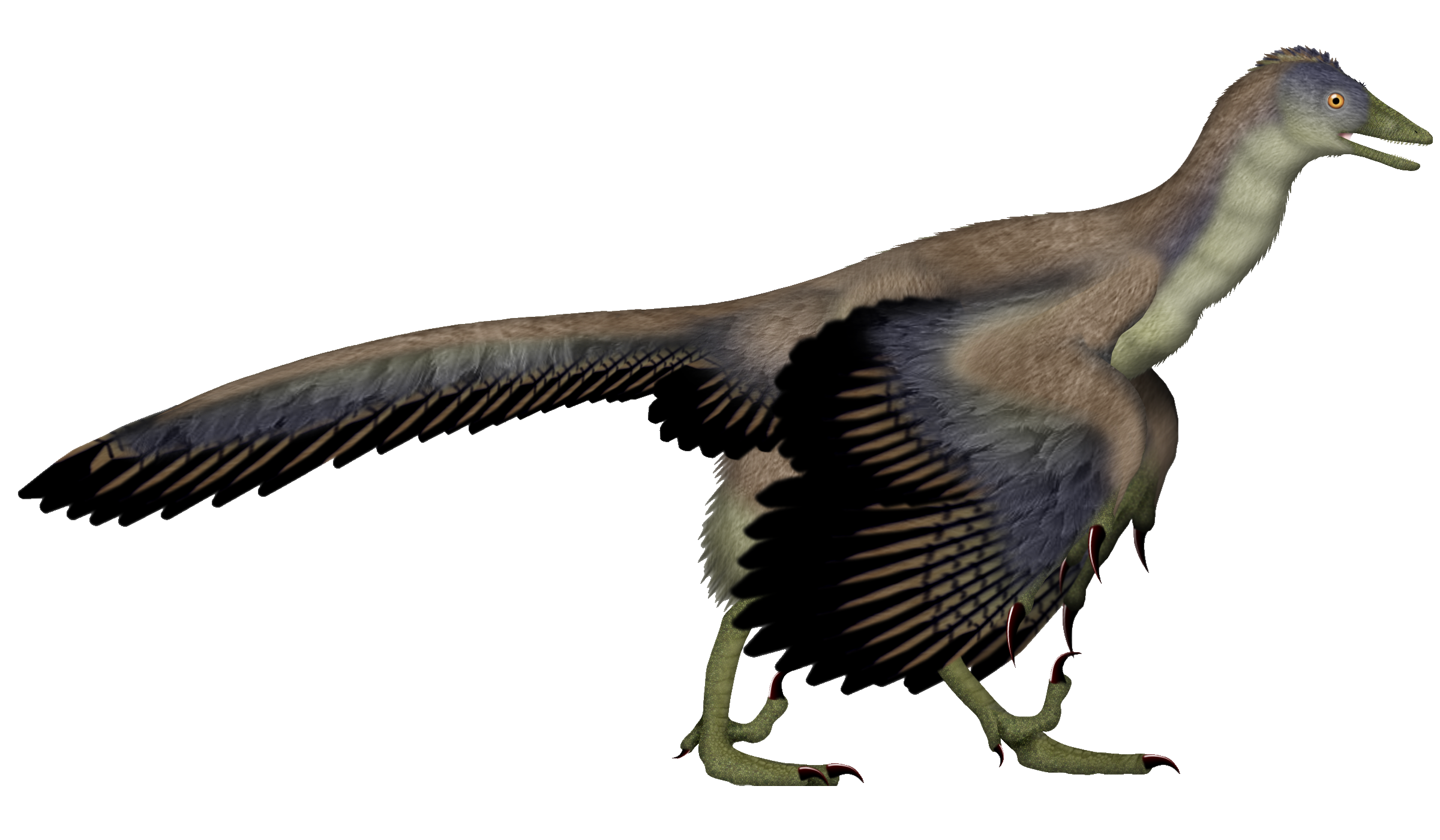
Life restoration of the more basal Archaeopteryx

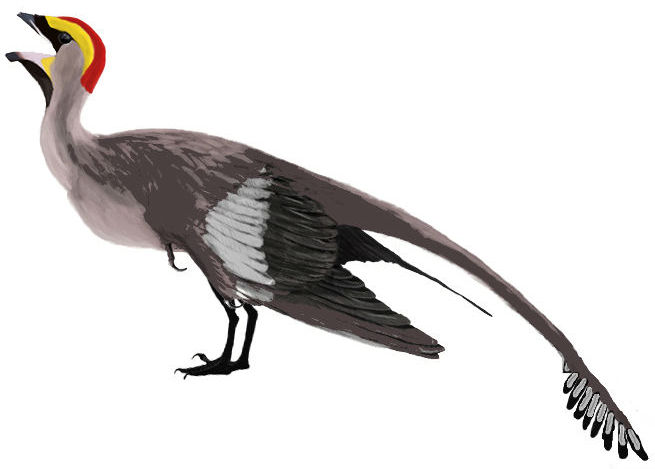
Life restoration of the more derived Jeholornis

To test the affinities and relationships of Yuezhuornis, Xu et al. (2026) included it in an updated version of the phylogenetic matrix of Wang et al. (2026). Yuezhuornis was recovered as the sister taxon to the contemporary Zhengheornis, a clade Xu et al. named Zhengheornithidae. These taxa are placed within the Avialae, diverging after Anchiornithidae and Archaeopteryx, but immediately before the coeval Baminornis. These results are displayed in the cladogram below:

- Paraves
  - †Deinonychosauria
    - †Dromaeosauridae
    - †Troodontidae
  - Avialae
    - †Anchiornithidae
      ⊞
      - †Anchiornis
      - †Aurornis
      - †Eosinopteryx
      - †Fujianvenator
      - †Xiaotingia
      ⊟
    - - †Archaeopteryx
      - - †Zhengheornithidae
          - †Yuezhuornis
          - †Zhengheornis
        - - †Baminornis
          - - †Jeholornis
            - Pygostylia
              - †Confuciusornithidae
              - - †Sapeornis
                - - †Jinguofortisidae
                  - Ornithothoraces
                    - †Enantiornithes
                    - Euornithes

== Paleobiology ==
The forelimb of Yuezhuornis combines a long humerus with a short metacarpus. The forelimb overall is proportionally much shorter than the hindlimb. These features are most similar to non-avialan paravians (which are regarded as being incapable of flight) and flightless birds. This suggests that either Yuezhuornis lost the ability for flight (thus being secondarily flightless) or that flight evolved twice within Avialae (once in Archaeopteryx and again in taxa more derived than Yuezhuornis). These features, in addition to the wide furcula, short coracoid, reduced deltopectoral crest on the humerus, and long tail, support a terrestrial ecology for Yuezhuornis.

== Paleoecology ==
Yuezhuornis is known from the Nanyuan Formation, which dates to around 150 to 148 million years ago, around the border between the Kimmeridgian and Tithonian ages of the late Jurassic period. The outcrops of this formation have been interpreted as representing a primarily swamp-like depositional environment. Most of the vertebrate fossils from the formation represent aquatic and semiaquatic animals, including indeterminate unnamed teleost fish, turtles, and choristoderes. Some other avialan dinosaur fossils have also been discovered, including the anchiornithid Fujianvenator, the closely related Zhengheornis, the more derived Baminornis, and some additional indeterminate birds, including a possible ornithuromorph known from a furcula. This lagerstätte is collectively referred to as the Zhenghe Fauna.
