= Zhengheornis =

Zhengheornis Temporal range: Late Jurassic (Kimmeridgian–Tithonian), 150–148 Ma

Scientific classification
- Kingdom: Animalia
- Phylum: Chordata
- Class: Reptilia
- Clade: Dinosauria
- Clade: Saurischia
- Clade: Theropoda
- Clade: Avialae
- Family: †Zhengheornithidae
- Genus: †Zhengheornis; Wang et al., 2026
- Species: †Z. buyu

Binomial name
- †Zhengheornis buyu Wang et al., 2026

Genus of extinct avialan

Zhengheornis (lit. 'Zhenghe bird') is an extinct genus of basal avialan known from the Late Jurassic (Kimmeridgian–Tithonian ages) Nanyuan Formation of China.The genus contains a single species, Zhengheornis buyu, known from a partial skeleton with feather traces, preserved on a slab and counterslab.

== Discovery and naming ==
The Zhengheornis fossil material was discovered during fieldwork from March to April 2024, in outcrops of the Nanyuan Formation ('layer 6') near Yangyuan Village of Zhenghe County, Fujian Province, China. The specimen is housed in the Institute of Vertebrate Paleontology and Paleoanthropology (IVPP), where it is permanently accessioned as specimen IVPP V34168. It consists of a partial articulated skeleton with associated feather traces, preserved as a slab and counterslab. Known material includes much of the post-cervical vertebral column, part of the pelvis, and much of the forelimbs and hindlimbs, much of which is preserved as molds.

In 2026, Min Wang and colleagues described Zhengheornis buyu as a new genus and species of early avialan dinosaur based on these fossil remains, establishing IVPP V34168 as the holotype specimen. The generic name, Zhengheornis, combines a reference to the discovery of the only known specimen in Zhenghe County, with the Greek word ornis, meaning 'bird'. The specific name, buyu, is a Mandarin word meaning 'unexpected', referencing the distinctive morphology of the pelvis and tail of this species.

== Classification ==
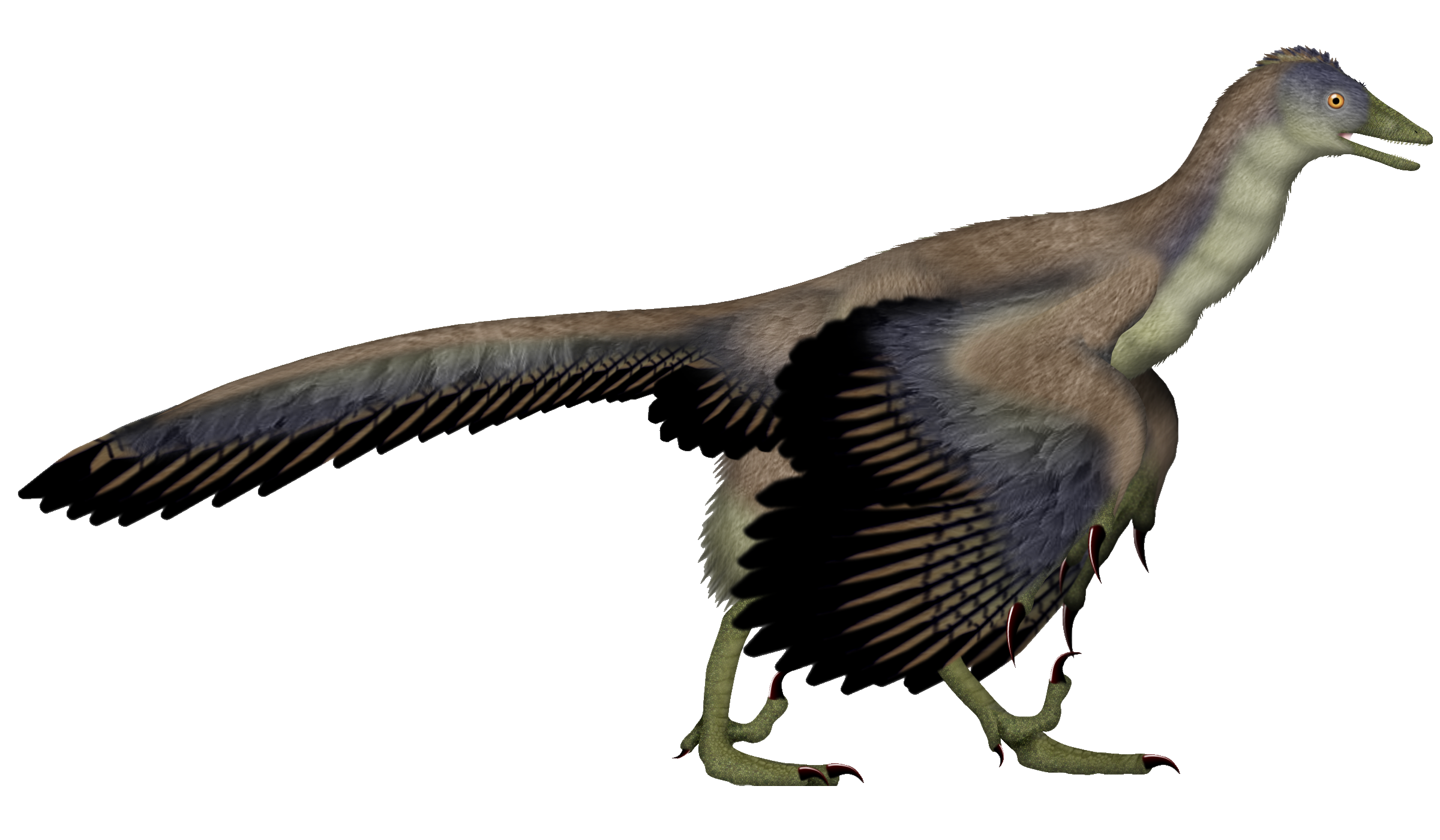
Life restoration of the more basal Archaeopteryx

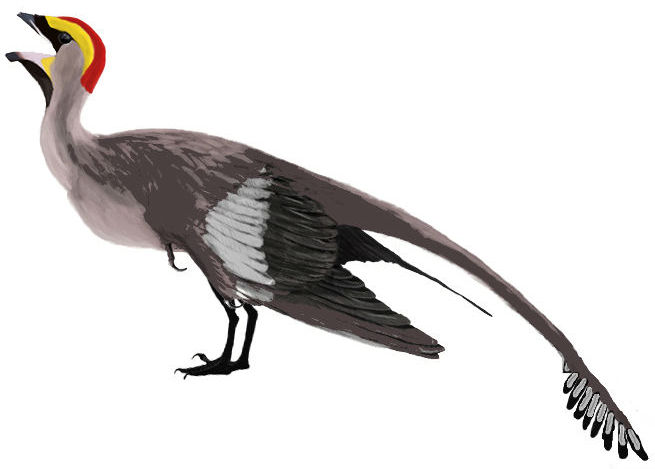
Life restoration of the more derived Jeholornis

To test the affinities and relationships of Zhengheornis, Wang et al. (2026) included it in an updated version of the phylogenetic matrix of Chen et al. (2025). Zhengheornis was recovered as a member of the Avialae, diverging after Anchiornithidae and Archaeopteryx, but immediately before the coeval Baminornis. Later that year, Xu et al. named Yuezhuornis, another avialan from the Nanyuan Formation. Using the matrix of Wang et al., they recovered Yuezhuornis and Zhengheornis as sister taxa, a clade they named Zhengheornithidae. These results are displayed in the cladogram below:

- Paraves
  - †Deinonychosauria
    - †Dromaeosauridae
    - †Troodontidae
  - Avialae
    - †Anchiornithidae
      ⊞
      - †Anchiornis
      - †Aurornis
      - †Eosinopteryx
      - †Fujianvenator
      - †Xiaotingia
      ⊟
    - - †Archaeopteryx
      - - †Zhengheornithidae
          - †Yuezhuornis
          - †Zhengheornis
        - - †Baminornis
          - - †Jeholornis
            - Pygostylia
              - †Confuciusornithidae
              - - †Sapeornis
                - - †Jinguofortisidae
                  - Ornithothoraces
                    - †Enantiornithes
                    - Euornithes

== Paleoecology ==
Zhengheornis is known from the Nanyuan Formation, which dates to around 150 million years ago, around the border between the Kimmeridgian and Tithonian ages of the late Jurassic period. The outcrops of this formation have been interpreted as representing a primarily swamp-like depositional environment. Most of the vertebrate fossils from the formation represent aquatic and semiaquatic animals, including indeterminate unnamed teleost fish, turtles, and choristoderes. Some avialan dinosaur fossils have also been discovered, including the anchiornithid Fujianvenator, the closely related Yuezhuornis, the more derived Baminornis, and some additional indeterminate birds, including a possible ornithuromorph known from a furcula. This lagerstätte is collectively referred to as the Zhenghe Fauna.
