= Baminornis =

Baminornis Temporal range: Late Jurassic (Kimmeridgian), 150.2–149.9 Ma

Scientific classification
- Kingdom: Animalia
- Phylum: Chordata
- Class: Reptilia
- Clade: Dinosauria
- Clade: Saurischia
- Clade: Theropoda
- Clade: Avialae
- Genus: †Baminornis; Chen et al., 2025
- Species: †B. zhenghensis

Binomial name
- †Baminornis zhenghensis Chen et al., 2025

Genus of extinct avialan

Baminornis (meaning "Fujian Province bird") is an extinct genus of basal avialan known from the Upper Jurassic (Kimmeridgian age) Nanyuan Formation of China. The genus contains a single species, Baminornis zhenghensis, known from a partial skeleton. Baminornis was initially identified as the oldest known avialan to bear a fused pygostyle, but later research cast doubt on the identification of this structure, claiming it could instead be part of the synsacrum.

== Discovery and naming ==
The Baminornis holotype specimen, IVPP V33259, was discovered in outcrops of the Nanyuan Formation ('layer 2') near Yangyuan Village of Zhenghe County in Fujian Province, China. The specimen is incomplete and partially articulated, comprising bones of the left forelimb, and hindlimb, partial left pectoral and pelvic girdles, dorsal and caudal vertebrae, the pygostyle, and several ribs and gastralia.

In 2025, Chen et al. described Baminornis zhenghensis as a new genus and species of early birds based on these fossil remains. The generic name, Baminornis, combines Bamin—the Mandarin word for Fujian Province—with the Greek word ornis, meaning "bird". The specific name, zhenghensis, references the discovery of the fossil in Zhenghe County.

== Description ==
Baminornis is a small avialan. Its body mass is estimated at 130–300 grams (0.29–0.66 lb) based on the circumference of the femur shaft. Chen et al. (2025) identified a vertebral structure as a robust pygostyle comprising five fused vertebrae, curving upward. Later researchers noted that this identification of the bone was unlikely, and that it could more parsimoniously be recognized as part of the synsacrum. Similar to other Jurassic avialans, the ilium is about half the length of the femur. As such, it is proportionally shorter than in more derived taxa. The shoulder girdle, including the scapula and coracoid, is unfused, more similar to crownward taxa. This may imply improved flight abilities compared to the similarly-aged Archaeopteryx.

== Classification ==
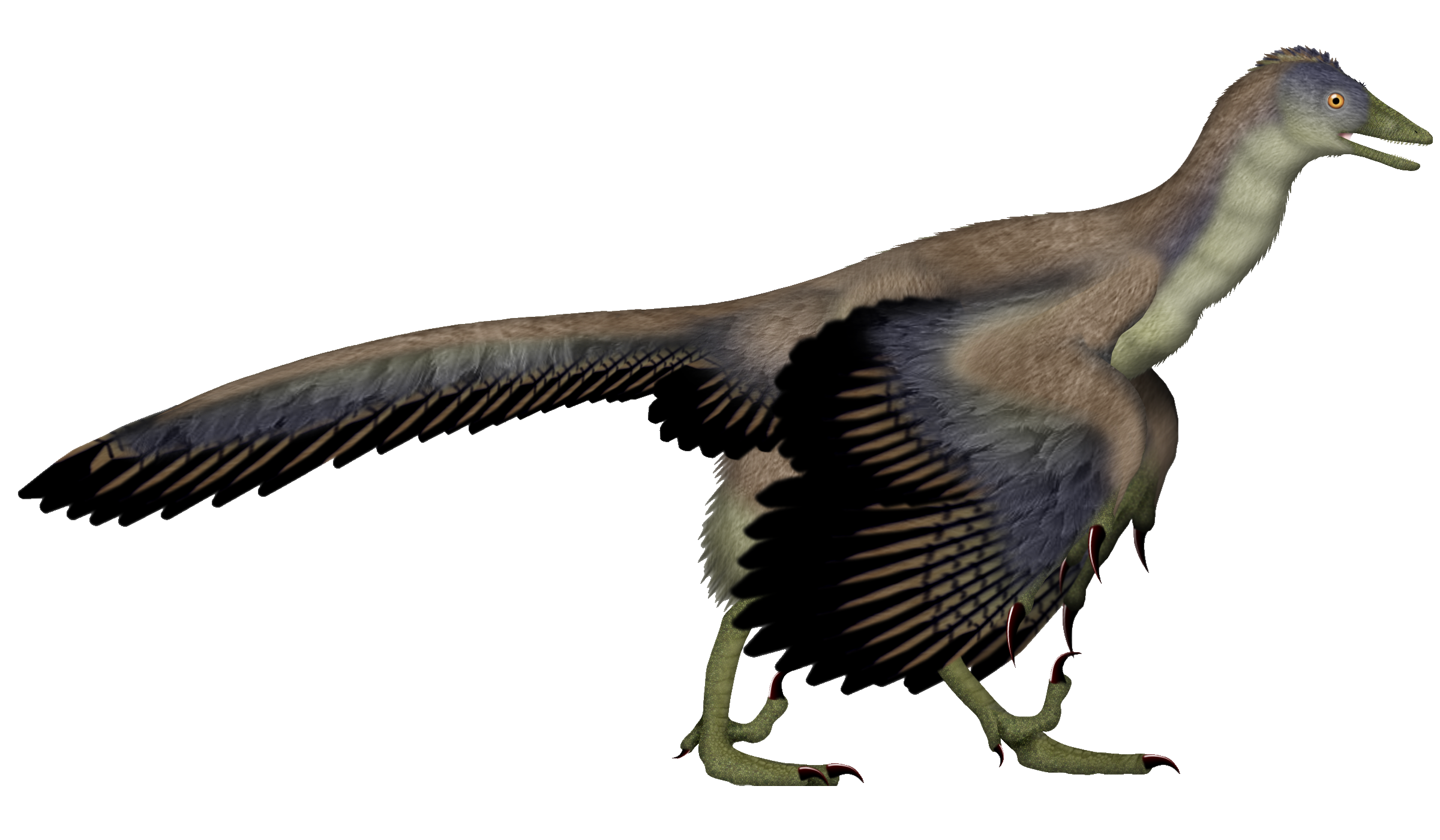
Life restoration of the more basal Archaeopteryx

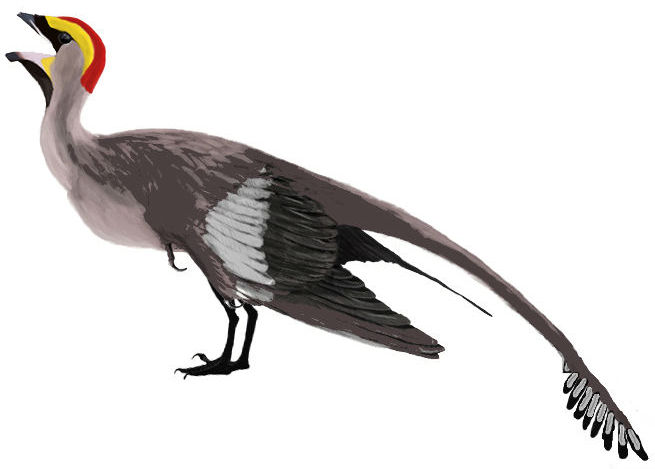
Life restoration of the more derived Jeholornis

In their phylogenetic analyses, Chen et al. (2025) recovered Baminornis as a basally-branching member of the Avialae, diverging after Archaeopteryx but before Jeholornis. The researchers noted that the presence of a pygostyle in Baminornis could warrant a redefinition of the short-tailed bird clade Pygostylia. However, Jeholornis does not have a pygostyle; under this scenario, it re-evolved its long tail from short-tailed ancestors. Alternatively, this pygostyle structure may have evolved in Baminornis independently of the later-diverging taxa. Regardless, Baminornis indicates that some of the earliest avialans possessed a pygostyle 20 million years earlier than previously recognized. This highlights the complexity of early bird evolution and the irregular acquisition of seemingly derived traits.

The results of the analyses of Chen et al. are displayed in the cladogram below, with the two alternate placements of Pygostylia noted:

- Paraves
  - - †Troodontidae
    - †Dromaeosauridae
  - Avialae
    - †Anchiornithidae
      - †Eosinopteryx
      - †Aurornis
      - †Xiaotingia
      - †Anchiornis
      - †Fujianvenator
    - - †Archaeopteryx
      - Pygostylia (alternative definition)
        - †Baminornis
        - - †Jeholornis
          - Pygostylia (traditional definition)
            - †Jinguofortisidae
            - - †Confuciusornithidae
              - Ornithothoraces
                - †Enantiornithes
                - Euornithes

The presence of a pygostyle was disputed in a blog post by paleontologist Mickey Mortimer; based on the size, morphology, and preservation style, they instead interpreted this structure as the synsacrum, explaining that this reidentification is more parsimonious with the phylogenetic position proposed for Baminornis by Chen et al. In the later description of the euornithean bird Kunpengornis, Huang et al. (2025) corroborated this hypothesis, citing Mortimer's reasoning. The researchers included Baminornis in an independent phylogenetic analysis and recovered it in an effectively identical position, despite coding the presence of a pygostyle as "unknown", diverging after Archaeopteryx (and Alcmonavis), but before Jeholornis (the latter of which was found in a broader clade, Jeholornithiformes, also including Shenzhouraptor and Kompsornis).

== Paleoecology ==
Baminornis is known from the Nanyuan Formation, which dates to around 150 million years ago, during the latest Kimmeridgian age of the late Jurassic period. The outcrops of this formation have been interpreted as representing a primarily swamp-like depositional environment. Most of the vertebrate fossils from the formation came from aquatic and semiaquatic animals, including indeterminate unnamed teleost fish, turtles, and choristoderes. However, some avialan fossils have also been discovered, including the anchiornithid Fujianvenator and some indeterminate birds, including a possible ornithuromorph known from a furcula. This lagerstätte is referred to as the Zhenghe Fauna.

== See also ==
- Pygostylia
- 2025 in archosaur paleontology
- List of bird species described in the 2020s
