= G1513 Wenzhou–Lishui Expressway =

Expressway in Zhejiang, China

Wenzhou–Lishui Expressway
- 温州－丽水高速公路
- Wenli Expressway 温丽高速公路
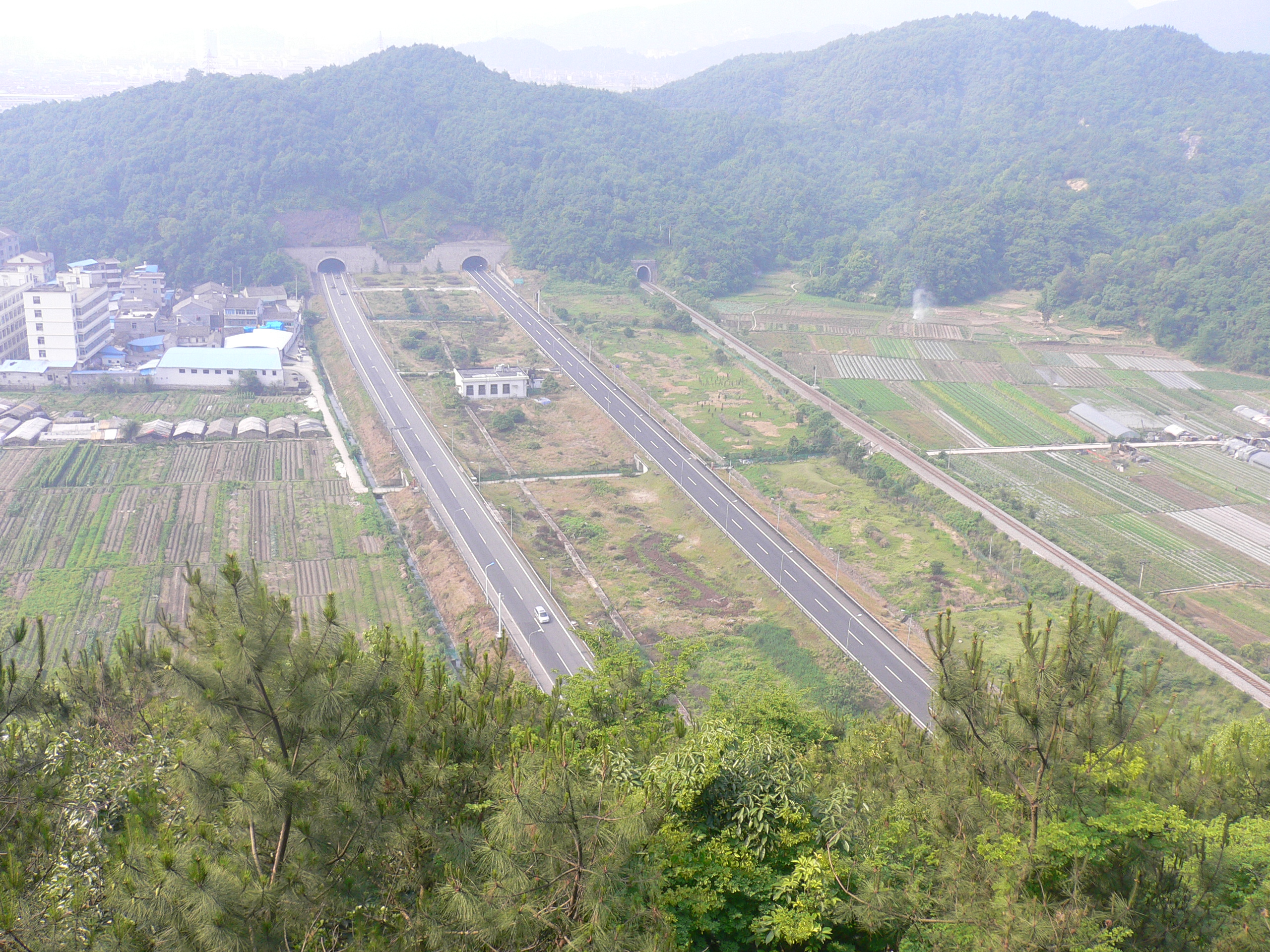
- G1513 Expressway at Lucheng

Route information
- Auxiliary route of G15

Major junctions
- Southeast end: G15 in Wenzhou
- Northwest end: G25 in Lishui

Location
- Country: China

Highway system
- National Trunk Highway System; Primary; Auxiliary; National Highways; Transport in China
← G1512	→ G1514

The G1513 Wenzhou–Lishui Expressway (Chinese: 温州—丽水高速公路), commonly referred to as the Wenli Expressway (Chinese: 温丽高速公路), is an expressway that connects the cities of Wenzhou, Zhejiang, China, and Lishui, Zhejiang. The expressway is a spur of G15 Shenyang–Haikou Expressway and is entirely in Zhejiang Province.
