= Tieshan, Zhenghe County =

Tieshan 铁山镇
- Town
- Location in Fujian Tieshan (China)
- Coordinates: 27°23′41″N 118°55′29″E
- Country: People's Republic of China
- Province: Fujian
- Prefecture-level city: Nanping
- County: Zhenghe County
- Time zone: UTC+8 (China Standard)

Tieshan (simplified Chinese: 铁山; traditional Chinese: 鐵山; pinyin: Tiěshān) is a town in Zhenghe County, Fujian province, China. As of 2020, it administers Niubeishan Residential Community (牛背山社区) and the following fourteen villages:

- Tieshan Village
- Nangan Village (南干村)
- Donggan Village (东干村)
- Litunyang Village (李屯洋村)
- Dahong Village (大红村)
- Jiangshang Village (江上村)
- Zhangtun Village (张屯村)
- Xiangqian Village (向前村)
- Gaolin Village (高林村)
- Banyuan Village (半源村)
- Fenglin Village (凤林村)
- Yuanshan Village (元山村)
- Daling Village (大岭村)
- Luojiadi Village (罗家地村)

== See also ==
- List of township-level divisions of Fujian
