= G1515 Yancheng–Jingjiang Expressway =

Expressway in Jiangsu, China

Yancheng–Jingjiang Expressway
- 盐城－靖江高速公路
- Yanjing Expressway 盐靖高速公路

Route information
- Auxiliary route of G15
- Length: 167.7 km (104.2 mi)

Major junctions
- North end: G15 in Yancheng, Jiangsu
- South end: G2 / G40 in Jingjiang, Taizhou, Jiangsu

Location
- Country: China

Highway system
- National Trunk Highway System; Primary; Auxiliary; National Highways; Transport in China
← G1514	→ G1516

The G1515 Yancheng–Jingjiang Expressway (Chinese: 盐城－靖江高速公路), commonly referred to as the Yanjing Expressway (Chinese: 盐靖高速公路), is an expressway in China that connects the cities of Yancheng and Jingjiang.

== Route ==
The expressway starts at Yancheng, passes through Jiangyan, and ends at Jingjiang, with a total length of 167.7 kilometers and is located entirely in the province of Jiangsu. The first phase of the project was opened to traffic on 30 November 2001, and the second phase of the project was opened to traffic on 22 October 2002. The final section of the project was opened to traffic on 26 August 2008.
