= G1512 Ningbo–Jinhua Expressway =

Expressway in Zhejiang, China

Ningbo–Jinhua Expressway
- 宁波－金华高速公路
- Yongjin Expressway 甬金高速公路

Route information
- Auxiliary route of G15
- Length: 185.56 km (115.30 mi)
- Existed: December 28, 2005–present

Major junctions
- East end: G15 / G1504 in Yinzhou District, Ningbo
- G1522 Zhejiang S9 in Shengzhou, Shaoxing; Zhejiang S26 in Dongyang, Jinhua; Zhejiang S45 in Yiwu, Jinhua
- West end: G60 in Jindong District, Jinhua

Location
- Country: China

Highway system
- National Trunk Highway System; Primary; Auxiliary; National Highways; Transport in China
← G1511	→ G1513

The G1512 Ningbo–Jinhua Expressway (Chinese: 宁波—金华高速公路), commonly referred to as the Yongjin Expressway (Chinese: 甬金高速公路), is a 185.56-kilometre-long expressway (115.30 mi) that connects the cities of Ningbo and Jinhua in the Chinese province of Zhejiang. The expressway is an auxiliary route of G15 Shenyang–Haikou Expressway. This expressway was opened on December 28, 2005.

== Route ==
The expressway is entirely in Zhejiang and connects the following cities:

- Ningbo
- Shengzhou
- Jinhua
