= G1514 Ningde–Shangrao Expressway =

Road in China

Ningde–Shangrao Expressway
- 宁德－上饶高速公路
- Ningshang Expressway 宁上高速公路

Route information
- Auxiliary route of G15

Major junctions
- Southeast end: Ningde, Fujian
- Northwest end: G60 in Shangrao, Jiangxi

Location
- Country: China

Highway system
- National Trunk Highway System; Primary; Auxiliary; National Highways; Transport in China
← G1513	→ G1515

The G1514 Ningde–Shangrao Expressway (Chinese: 宁德—上饶高速公路), commonly referred to as the Ningshang Expressway (Chinese: 宁上高速公路), is an expressway that connects the cities of Ningde in Fujian Province and Shangrao in Jiangxi Province, in the East China region of China.

The expressway is a spur of G15 Shenyang–Haikou Expressway.

== Exit ==
County	Location	mi	km	Exit	Destinations	Notes
