= Fujianvenator =

Fujianvenator Temporal range: Late Jurassic (Tithonian), 149.9–150.2 Ma

Scientific classification
- Kingdom: Animalia
- Phylum: Chordata
- Class: Reptilia
- Clade: Dinosauria
- Clade: Saurischia
- Clade: Theropoda
- Family: †Anchiornithidae
- Genus: †Fujianvenator; Xu et al., 2023
- Species: †F. prodigiosus

Binomial name
- †Fujianvenator prodigiosus Xu et al., 2023

Extinct genus of anchiornithid dinosaurs

Fujianvenator (meaning "Fujian hunter") is an extinct genus of anchiornithid theropod dinosaur from the Late Jurassic Nanyuan Formation of Fujian Province, China. The genus contains a single species, F. prodigiosus, known from a partial articulated skeleton. It is suggested to possibly have had a terrestrial or wading lifestyle.

== Discovery and naming ==
The Fujianvenator holotype specimen, IVPP V31985, was discovered during expeditions in October and November 2022 in the Nanyuan Formation near Yangyuan Village in Zhenghe County, Fujian Province, China. The specimen consists of a partial articulated skeleton preserved on a slab and counterslab. The fossil specimen is missing the skull, neck, and the end of the tail.

In 2023, Xu et al. described Fujianvenator prodigiosus as a new genus and species of anchiornithid theropod based on these fossil remains. The generic name, "Fujianvenator", combines a reference to Fujian Province, where the holotype was discovered, with the Latin word "venator", meaning "hunter". The specific name, "prodigiosus", is derived from a Latin word meaning "bizarre".

== Description ==
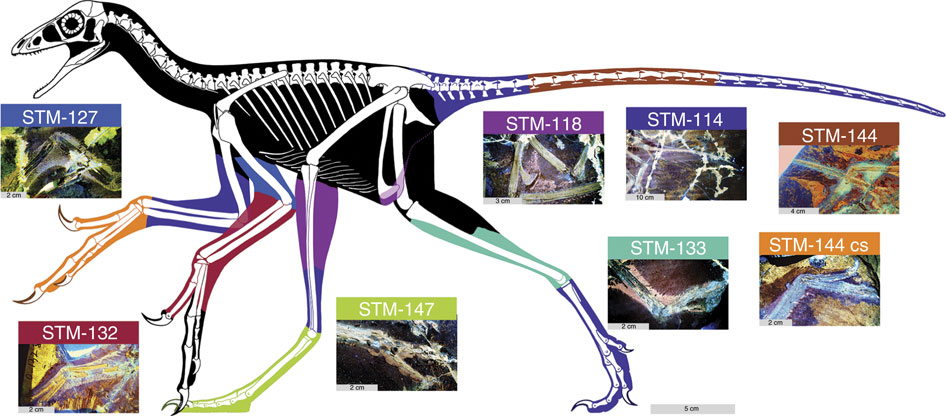
Skeletal restoration of the related Anchiornis by Scott Hartman

Fujianvenator weighed approximately 641 grams (1.413 lb), which is similar in size to the koklass pheasant. As the tibiotarsus and metacarpals are unfused, Xu et al. observed that the holotype individual would not have been skeletally mature when it died. However, the ossified sternum, fused astragalus and calcaneum, and closed sutures of the dorsal vertebrae indicate that the animal was likely a subadult.

== Paleobiology ==
In some theropods, including other anchiornithids, the scapula is around 60% the length of the humerus. In Fujianvenator, the ratio is closer to 40%. In avialans, an enlarged scapula is generally associated with the muscles necessary for powered flight. Furthermore, details of its metacarpals suggest that Fujianvenator would have had flexible grasping fingers, which could have aided in capturing prey. In more derived avialans, the metacarpals form a single immobile unit that primarily serves as the attachment site for flight feathers.

Fujianvenator had proportionately long legs; the tibia of Fujianvenator is twice as long as the femur. This suggests that it may have had a more terrestrial lifestyle than arboreal and flying avialans that diverged later. In animals, elongated tibiae and metatarsi increase stride length, thus improving running abilities. In their description of Fujianvenator, Xu et al. (2023) analyzed the cursoriality of various theropods including Fujianvenator. The cursorial score of Fujianvenator was much higher than that of troodontids and tyrannosaurids, which are generally accepted to have been adept at running. This may indicate that it was a particularly cursorial animal. Conversely, elongated lower legs are also associated with a wading ecology, as is seen in some extant birds like cranes and storks. The limb proportions of Fujianvenator are similar to wading birds, so this behavior is also possible. Since the toe bones of Fujianvenator are poorly preserved, it is difficult to further determine its exact ecology.

== Classification ==
Xu et al. (2023) recovered Fujianvenator as a young member of the clade Anchiornithidae, which they consider to be the basalmost avialans. Other studies have recovered members of the Anchiornithidae in various phylogenetic positions, including close to Troodontidae or Archaeopterygidae. The results of the phylogenetic analyses by Xu et al. are shown in the cladogram below:

- Pennaraptora
  - - †Scansoriopterygidae
    - †Oviraptorosauria
  - Paraves
    - †Deinonychosauria
      - Dromaeosauridae
      - Troodontidae
    - Avialae
      - - †Archaeopteryx
        - - †Jeholornis
          - Pygostylia
            - †Confuciusornithidae
            - Ornithothoraces
              - Ornithuromorpha
              - †Enantiornithes
      - †Anchiornithidae
        - Eosinopteryx
        - Aurornis
        - Xiaotingia
        - Anchiornis
        - Fujianvenator

== Paleoenvironment ==
Fujianvenator was discovered in layers of the Nanyuan Formation, which dates to the Tithonian stage of the Late Jurassic period, about 150.2-149.9 million years old. Most of the vertebrate fossils from the formation came from aquatic and semiaquatic animals, including indeterminate unnamed teleost fish, turtles, and choristoderes. Xu et al. (2023) named this lagerstätte the Zhenghe Fauna. The discovery of Fujianvenator with several aquatic and semiaquatic animals suggests that it lived in a swamp environment, which is an unusual ecological niche for an early avialan. This, together with its long legs, supports an ecology for Fujianvenator similar to extant wading birds.
