= Zhenghe County =

County in Fujian, China

Zhenghe County 政和县 Chengho
- County
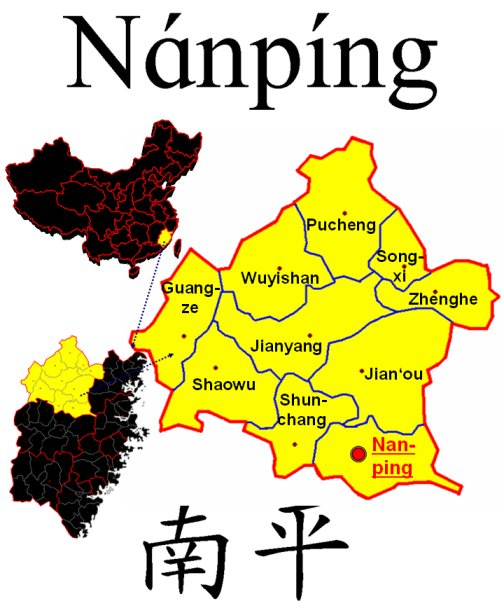
- Zhenghe in Nanping
- Coordinates: 27°21′58″N 118°51′29″E
- Country: People's Republic of China
- Province: Fujian
- Prefecture-level city: Nanping

Government
  - CPC County Committee Secretary: Huang Aihua

Area
  - Total: 1,735 km^{2} (670 sq mi)

Population (2009)
  - Total: 221,537
  - Density: 127.7/km^{2} (330.7/sq mi)
- Time zone: UTC+8 (China Standard)
- Postal code: 353600
- Licence plates: 闽H
- Website: www.zhenghe.gov.cn

Zhenghe County (simplified Chinese: 政和县; traditional Chinese: 政和縣; pinyin: Zhènghé Xiàn) is a county of northern Fujian province, People's Republic of China, bordering Zhejiang to the north. It is under the administration of the prefecture-level city of Nanping. The Min-Bei dialect, or Northern Min (Guing'ei Di) prevails in Zhenghe County.

== History ==
Zhenghe became a county in 1000AD, but its previous name is Guanli (simplified Chinese: 关隶; traditional Chinese: 關隸; pinyin: Guānlì). In 1115AD, the emperor appreciated the Gongfu tea from Guanli County. He delightfully named the county after his reign title "Zhenghe", which lasts till now.

== Administration ==
=== 1 Subdistrict ===
- Xiongshan (熊山街道)

=== 4 Towns ===
- Dongping (东平镇)
- Tieshan (铁山镇)
- Zhenqian (镇前镇)
- Shitun (石屯镇)

=== 5 Townships ===
- Xingxi (星溪乡)
- Waitun (外屯乡)
- Yangyuan (杨源乡)
- Chengyuan (澄源乡)
- Lingyao (岭腰乡)

== Climate ==
Climate data for Zhenghe, elevation 262 m (860 ft), (1991–2020 normals, extremes 1981–2022)
Month	Jan	Feb	Mar	Apr	May	Jun	Jul	Aug	Sep	Oct	Nov	Dec	Year
Record high °C (°F)	28.4 (83.1)	32.3 (90.1)	33.1 (91.6)	34.6 (94.3)	36.4 (97.5)	37.6 (99.7)	42.0 (107.6)	42.1 (107.8)	39.2 (102.6)	37.0 (98.6)	33.8 (92.8)	26.1 (79.0)	42.1 (107.8)
Mean daily maximum °C (°F)	14.0 (57.2)	16.4 (61.5)	19.5 (67.1)	24.8 (76.6)	28.5 (83.3)	30.9 (87.6)	34.5 (94.1)	34.2 (93.6)	31.2 (88.2)	27.0 (80.6)	21.7 (71.1)	16.1 (61.0)	24.9 (76.8)
Daily mean °C (°F)	8.7 (47.7)	10.8 (51.4)	14.0 (57.2)	18.9 (66.0)	22.8 (73.0)	25.6 (78.1)	28.2 (82.8)	27.8 (82.0)	25.2 (77.4)	20.6 (69.1)	15.5 (59.9)	10.1 (50.2)	19.0 (66.2)
Mean daily minimum °C (°F)	5.2 (41.4)	7.2 (45.0)	10.3 (50.5)	14.8 (58.6)	18.8 (65.8)	22.0 (71.6)	23.7 (74.7)	23.6 (74.5)	21.0 (69.8)	16.1 (61.0)	11.4 (52.5)	6.2 (43.2)	15.0 (59.1)
Record low °C (°F)	−5.1 (22.8)	−4.0 (24.8)	−3.5 (25.7)	3.4 (38.1)	8.6 (47.5)	13.1 (55.6)	19.3 (66.7)	17.6 (63.7)	12.8 (55.0)	3.5 (38.3)	−1.7 (28.9)	−7.0 (19.4)	−7.0 (19.4)
Average precipitation mm (inches)	70.0 (2.76)	105.9 (4.17)	204.6 (8.06)	194.1 (7.64)	253.7 (9.99)	339.2 (13.35)	138.6 (5.46)	125.2 (4.93)	79.6 (3.13)	44.7 (1.76)	62.1 (2.44)	58.8 (2.31)	1,676.5 (66)
Average precipitation days (≥ 0.1 mm)	12	13.1	18.2	16.7	17.3	18.5	12.9	14.4	10.1	7.0	8.5	9.1	157.8
Average snowy days	0.8	0.6	0.1	0	0	0	0	0	0	0	0	0.4	1.9
Average relative humidity (%)	78	77	78	76	77	81	75	76	75	72	76	77	77
Mean monthly sunshine hours	99.2	94.0	98.3	119.4	133.1	130.8	225.6	207.7	178.7	172.0	130.9	125.9	1,715.6
Percentage possible sunshine	30	30	26	31	32	32	54	52	49	49	41	39	39
Source: China Meteorological Administration all-time May low

== Transportation ==
=== Expressways ===
- G15_{14} Ningde-Shangrao Expressway
- G25 Changchun-Shenzhen Expressway
- S0313 Gutian-Zhenghe Expressway

=== Provincial-level roads ===
- S204
- S301
- S302

== Specialty ==
Zhenghe is the second largest producer of chestnuts in China.

== See also ==
- List of administrative divisions of Fujian
