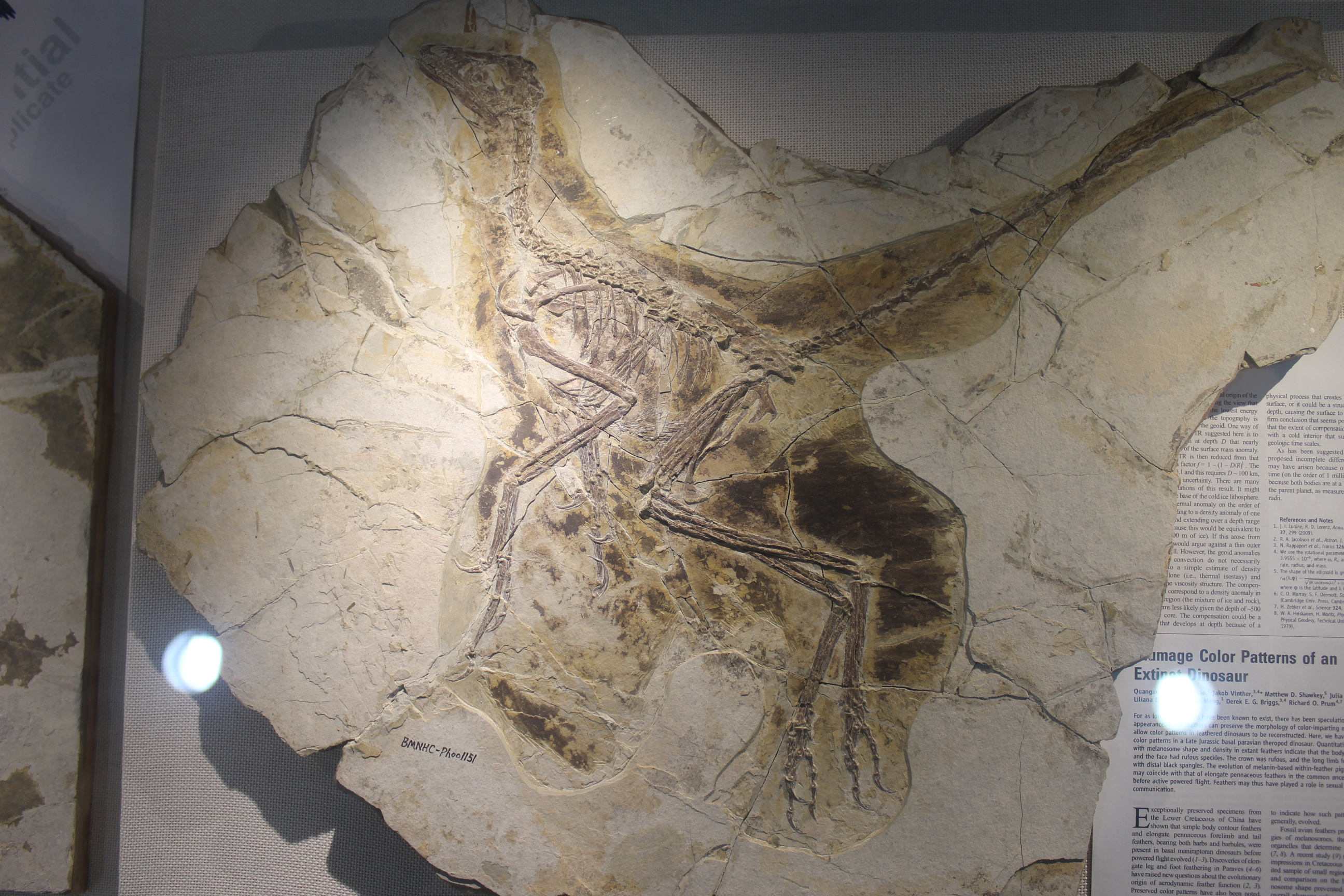
- Fossil specimen on display at the Beijing Museum of Natural History

Scientific classification
- Kingdom: Animalia
- Phylum: Chordata
- Class: Reptilia
- Clade: Dinosauria
- Clade: Saurischia
- Clade: Theropoda
- Clade: Paraves
- Family: †Anchiornithidae
- Genus: †Anchiornis; Xu et al., 2009
- Species: †A. huxleyi

Binomial name
- †Anchiornis huxleyi Xu et al., 2009

Synonyms
- Aurornis xui? Godefroit et al., 2013; Eosinopteryx brevipenna? Godefroit et al., 2013; Serikornis sungei? Lefèvre et al., 2017

= Anchiornis =

Anchiornis Temporal range: Late Jurassic (Oxfordian), 160.89–160.25 Ma

Extinct genus of dinosaurs

Anchiornis is a genus of small, four-winged paravian dinosaurs, with only one known species, the type species Anchiornis huxleyi, named for its similarity to modern birds. The Latin name Anchiornis derives from a Greek word meaning "near bird", and huxleyi refers to Thomas Henry Huxley, a contemporary of Charles Darwin. Anchiornis fossils have been found only in the Tiaojishan Formation of Liaoning, China, in rocks dated to the Late Jurassic, about 160 million years ago. It is known from hundreds of specimens, and given the exquisite preservation of some of these fossils, it became the first Mesozoic dinosaur species for which almost the entire life appearance could be determined, and an important source of information on the early evolution of birds.

== Discovery and history ==
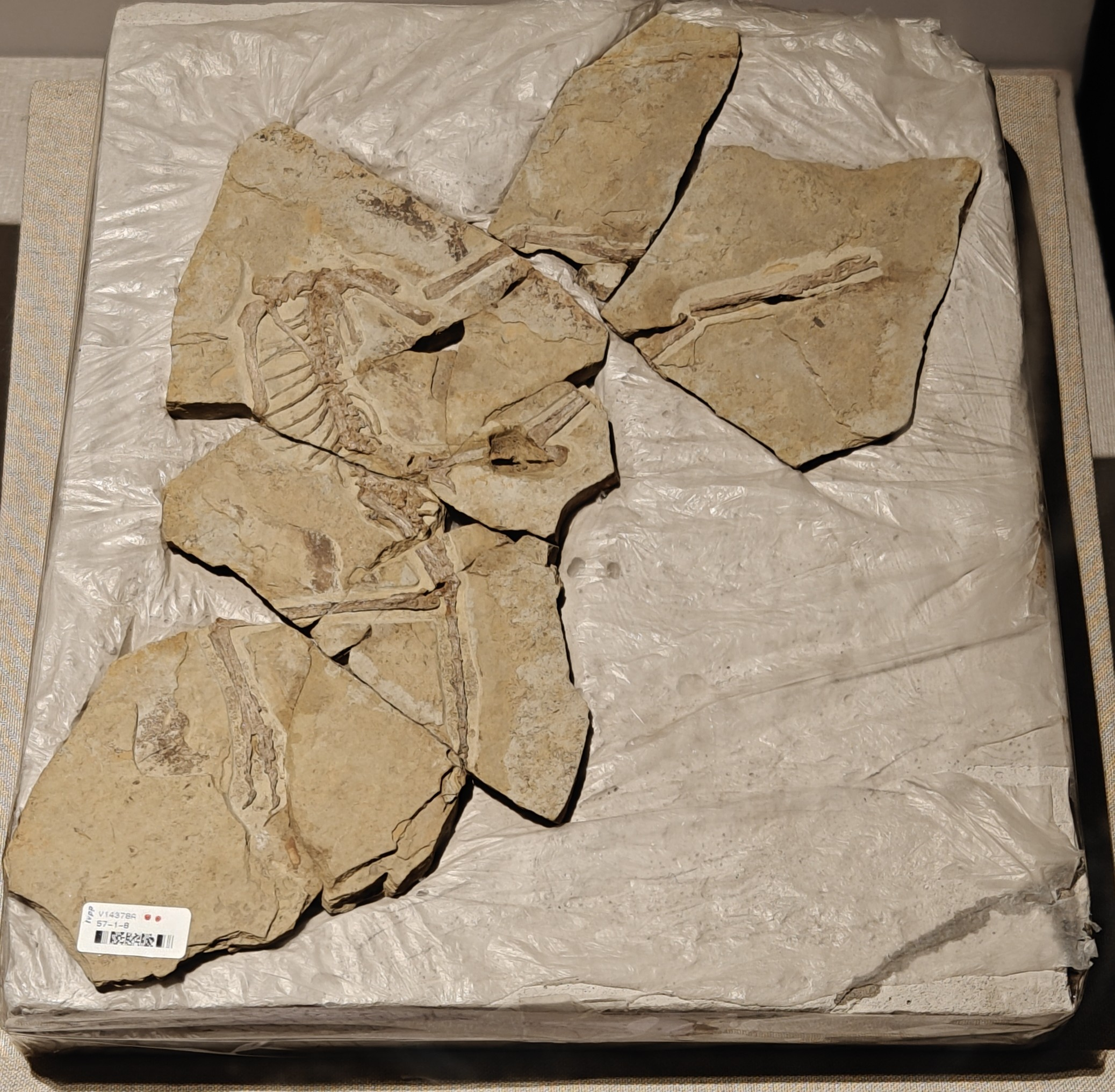
Holotype specimen, Shanghai Natural History Museum

The first known fossil of Anchiornis (its type specimen) was dug up in the Yaolugou area of Jianchang County, Liaoning, China. These rocks have been difficult to date, but most studies have concluded that they belong to the Tiaojishan Formation of rocks dated to the late Jurassic period (Oxfordian age), 160.89 to 160.25 million years old. Anchiornis was studied and described by paleontologist Xu Xing and colleagues in a paper accepted to the Chinese Science Bulletin in 2009. The specimen is currently in the collection of the Institute of Vertebrate Paleontology and Paleoanthropology with the catalogue number IVPP V14378. It is an articulated skeleton missing the skull, part of the tail, and the right forelimb. The name Anchiornis huxleyi was chosen by Xu and colleagues in honor of Thomas Henry Huxley, an early proponent of biological evolution, and one of the first to propose a close evolutionary relationship between birds and dinosaurs. The generic name Anchiornis comes from combining the Ancient Greek words for "nearby" and "bird", because it was interpreted as important in filling a gap in the transition between the body plans of birds and dinosaurs.

A second specimen came to light around the same time, and was given to a team of scientists from Shenyang Normal University by a local farmer when they were excavating at the Yaolugou dig site. According to the farmer, this second specimen had been found nearby in the area of Daxishan, also from Tiaojishan Formation rocks of about the same age as the first Anchiornis. Two scientists visited the site in order to compare the new fossil with the rock types found there, and were able to confirm that the new specimen probably did come from the area the farmer described. They were able to dig up several fish fossils and a third Anchiornis fossil. The farmer's fossil underwent study which was published on September 24, 2009, in the journal Nature. It was assigned the catalogue number LPM – B00 169 in the Liaoning Paleontological Museum. It is larger and much more complete than the first specimen, and preserved long wing feathers on the hands, arms, legs and feet, showing that it was a four-winged dinosaur similar to Microraptor.

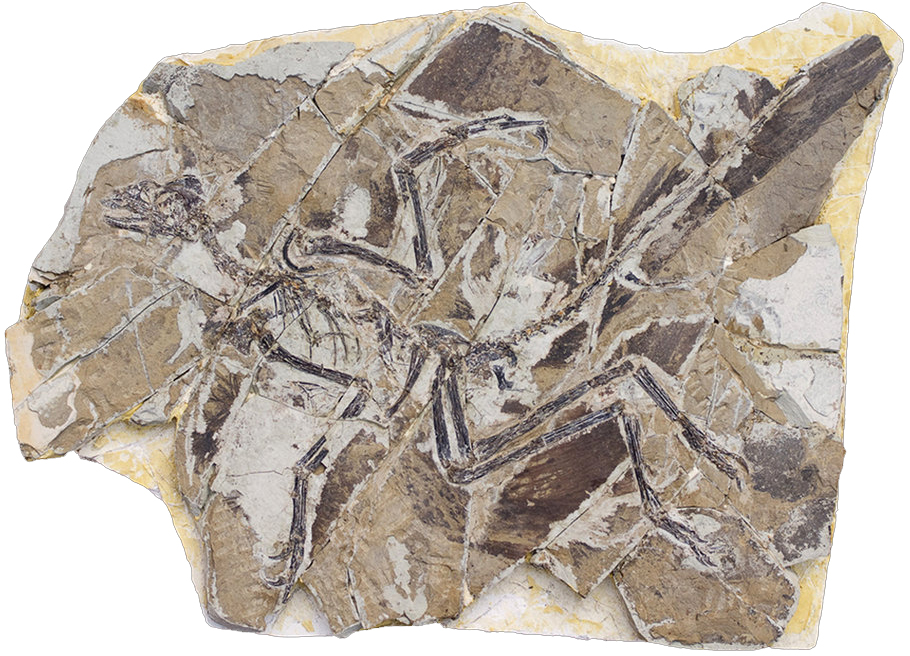
Anchiornis specimen YTGP-T5199

While only a few specimens have been described in detail, many more have been identified and are held in both private collections and museums. One of these, a nearly complete skeleton missing the tail, also preserving extensive feather remains, was reported in 2010. This fossil also showed evidence that Anchiornis had a feathered crest on its head, and was used to determine the animal's life coloration. It is housed in the Beijing Museum of Natural History with the specimen number BMNHC PH828. Another specimen from the same fossil quarry as the type specimen was found by a local fossil dealer and sold to the Yizhou Fossil & Geology Park and catalogued there as YTGP-T5199. This fossil, a nearly complete skeleton, was prepared and studied by scientists at the Geology Park and identified as an Anchiornis. It was then used for a scanning electron microscope study of Anchiornis feather microstructure. The study also examined the well-preserved melanosomes of the feathers to determine their color. The scientists involved in the study found that the coloration found for this specimen was different than the color reported for BMNHC PH828, and they noted that the BMNHC specimen may not in fact be Anchiornis, as it was described before similar species from the same formation had been discovered.

The Shandong Tianyu Museum of Nature in Pingyi County, China, for example, was reported to hold 255 specimens of Anchiornis in its collections in 2010. Among their collection is a very well preserved fossil with visible color patterns, catalogued as STM 0-214. While this specimen has yet to be fully described, it was photographed for a 2011 article in National Geographic and was used in a study of Anchiornis covert feathers and wing anatomy the following year.

== Description ==
Size compared with a human

Anchiornis huxleyi was a small, bipedal theropod dinosaur with a triangular skull bearing several details in common with dromaeosaurids, troodontids, and primitive avialans. Like other early paravians, Anchiornis was small, about the size of a crow. It had long, wing-bearing arms, long legs, and a long tail. Like all paravians, it was covered in feathers, though it also had scales on certain parts of the body. The wings, legs, and tail supported long but relatively narrow vaned feathers. Two types of simpler, downy (plumaceous) feathers covered the rest of the body, as in Sinornithosaurus: down feathers made up of filaments attached at their bases, and more complex down feathers with barbs attached along a central quill. Long, simple feathers covered almost the entire head and neck, torso, upper legs, and the first half of the tail. The rest of the tail bore pennaceous tail feathers (rectrices). Long feathers on the head (crown) may have formed a crest. While the first specimen of Anchiornis preserved only faint traces of feathers around the preserved portion of the body, many more well-preserved fossils have since been found. Studies of Anchiornis specimens using laser fluorescence have revealed not only more details of the feathers, but also of the skin and muscle tissue. Taken together, this evidence has given scientists a nearly complete picture of Anchiornis anatomy. Additional studies indicate that Anchiornis had body plumage that consisted of short quills with long and independent, flexible barbs. These barbs stuck out from the quills at low angles on two opposing blades. This also gave each feather an overall forked shape and resulted in the theropod possessing a softer textured and "shaggier" appearing plumage than is seen in modern birds. 'Shaggy' contour feathers probably influenced thermoregulatory and water repellence abilities, and, in combination with open-vaned wing feathers, would have decreased aerodynamic efficiency.

The holotype, belonging to a subadult or young adult individual, measured 34 centimetres (1.12 ft) long and weighed 110 grams (3.9 oz). The largest specimens measured 60–62 centimetres (1.97–2.03 ft) in total body length, nearly 57.4 centimetres (1.88 ft) in wingspan and weighed about 0.6–1 kilogram (1.3–2.2 lb). (Note: The wingspan estimate is based on the equation presented in the study by Dececchi et al. (2016) which states that the wingspan of the paravians in the study would have been 2.1 times the wing length. In case of Anchiornis, one of the largest specimens PKUP V1068 had a wing length of more than 27.3 centimetres (0.90 ft), resulting in a wingspan of nearly 57.4 centimetres (1.88 ft).)

=== Wings ===
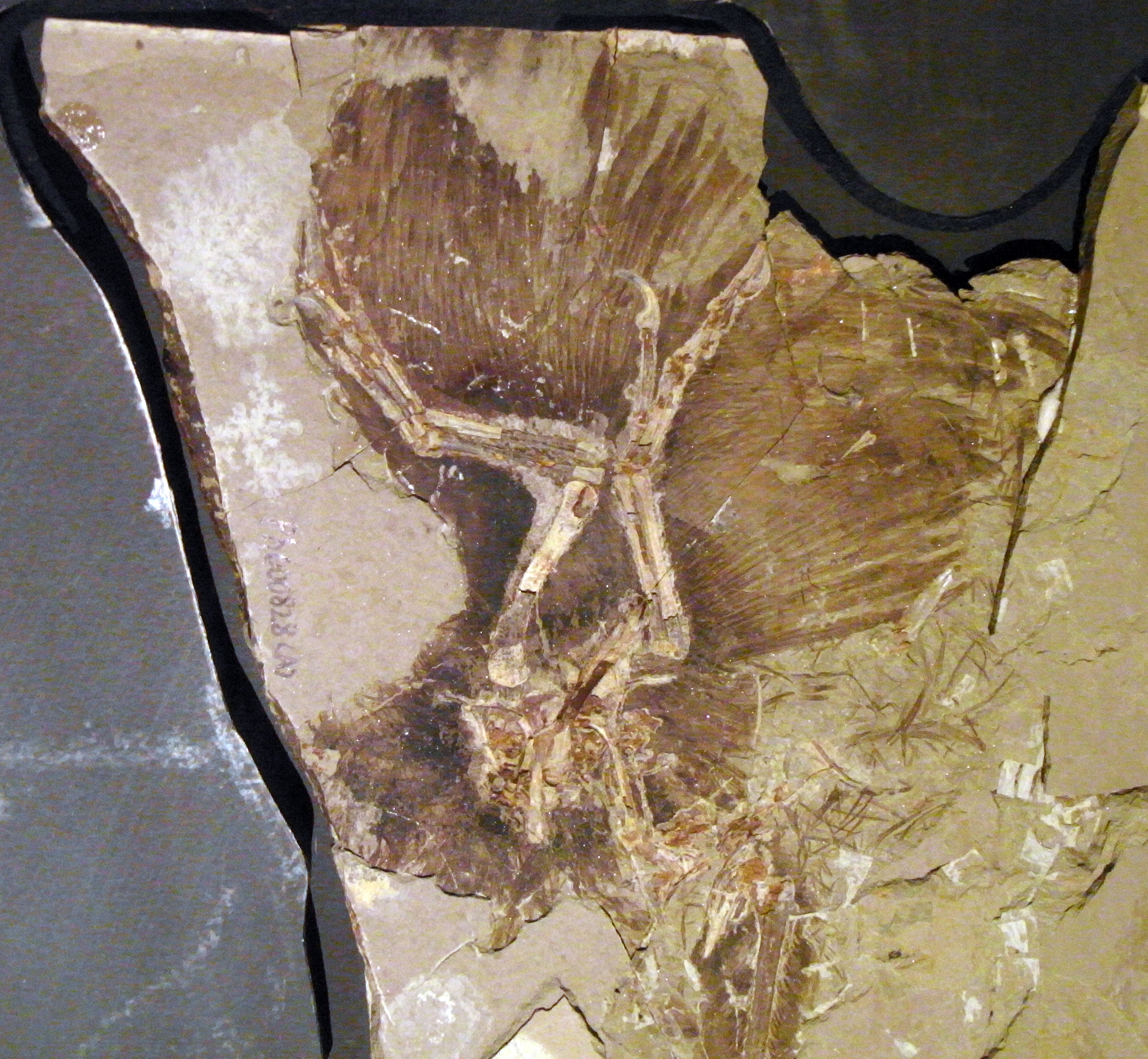
The Beijing specimen (BMNHC PH828) which had its coloration examined in 2010

Like other early paravians, Anchiornis had large wings made up of pennaceous feathers attached to the arm and hand. The wing of Anchiornis was composed of around 20-28 primary feathers, with research showing much variation among individuals.The primary feathers in Anchiornis were about as long as the secondaries, and formed a rounded wing. The wing feathers had curved but symmetrical central quills, with small and thin relative size, and rounded tips, all indicating poor aerodynamic ability. In the related dinosaurs Microraptor and Archaeopteryx, the longest wing feathers were closest to the tip of the wing, making the wings appear relatively long and pointed. However, in Anchiornis, the longest wing feathers were those nearest the wrist, making the wing broadest in the middle and tapering near the tip for a more rounded, less flight-adapted profile.

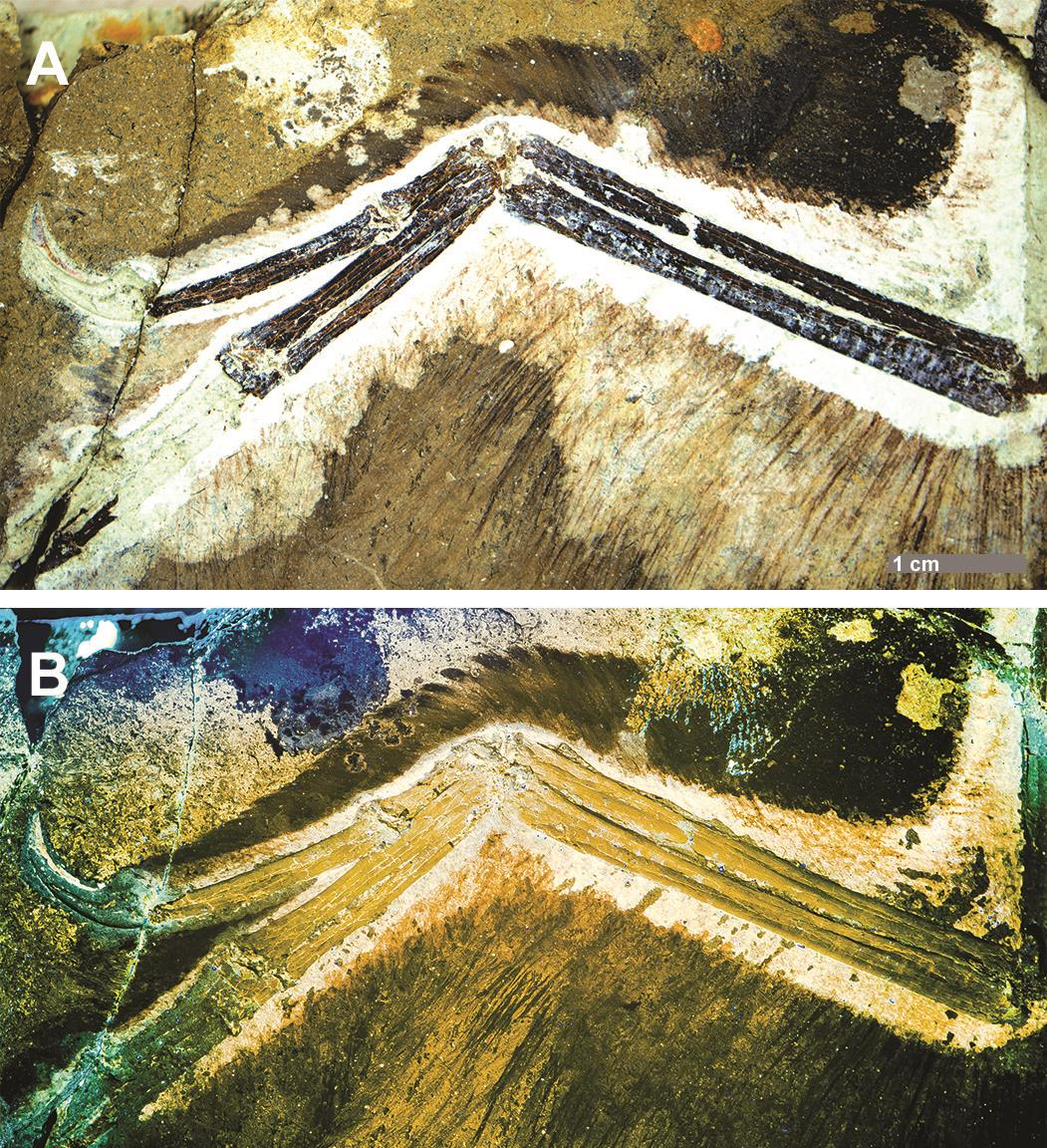
Wing of STM-0-144 including the skin outline (white areas) and remains of the feathers (dark areas)

Like other maniraptorans, Anchiornis had a propatagium, a flap of skin connecting the wrist to the shoulder and rounding out the front edge of the wing. In Anchiornis, this part of the wing was covered in covert feathers which smoothed the wing and covered the gaps between the larger primary and secondary feathers. However, unlike modern birds, the covert feathers of Anchiornis were not arranged in tracts or rows. The arrangement of the covert feathers was also more primitive in Anchiornis than in birds and more advanced paravians. In modern birds, the coverts usually cover only the upper portion of the wing, with most of the wing surface made up of uncovered flight feathers. In some Anchiornis fossils, on the other hand, several layers of covert feathers seem to extend down to cover most of the wing's surface, so that the wing is essentially made of multiple layers of feathers, rather than a layer of broad feathers with only their bases hidden by layers of coverts. This multi-layered wing arrangement might have helped strengthen the wing, considering that the primary and secondary feathers themselves were narrow and weak.

The wing included three clawed fingers; however, unlike in some more primitive theropods, the longest two fingers were not separate, but were bound together by the skin and other tissue forming the wing, so Anchiornis was functionally two-fingered. These bound fingers were incorporated into a post-patagium, or flap of skin and other tissues that helped support the bases of the main wing feathers. Like the toes, the skin around the bottom of the fingers was covered in tiny, rounded scales. Unlike the toes, the flesh around the underside of the finger bones was twice as thick as the bones themselves and lacked distinct pads; instead, the fingers were straight and smooth without any major creases at the joints. Scales and skin around the fingers is very rarely preserved in fossils of early pennaraptorans, the only notable exceptions being Anchiornis and Caudipteryx, which had similar thick, scaly fingers associated with its wings.

=== Legs ===
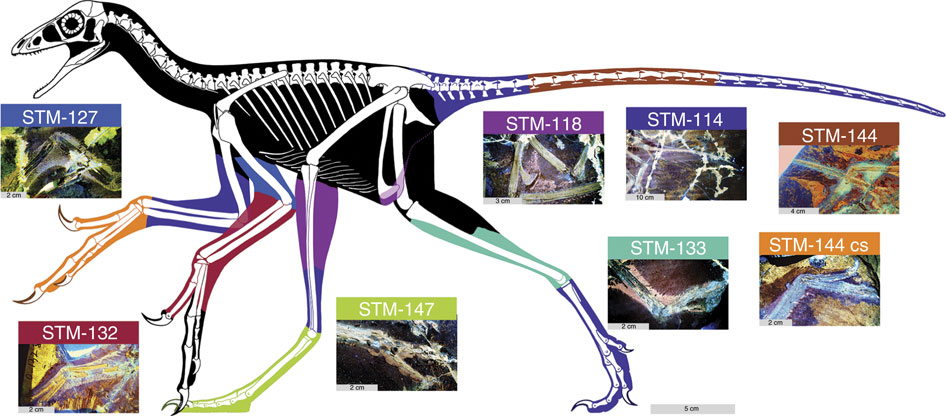
Skeletal restoration by Scott Hartman, 2017

In addition to the front wings, Anchiornis had long, vaned feathers on the hind legs. This has led many scientists to call Anchiornis a four-winged dinosaur, along with similar animals like Microraptor and Sapeornis. However, the feathers on the hind legs in Anchiornis did not have the shape or arrangement expected from flight feathers, and it is likely that their primary role was in display rather than flight.

Anchiornis had very long legs, which is usually an indication that an animal is a strong runner. However, the extensive leg feathers indicate that this may be a vestigial trait, as running animals tend to have reduced, not increased, hair or feathers on their legs. Like most paravians, Anchiornis had four toes on the foot, with the third and fourth toes the longest. The first toe, or hallux, was not reversed as in perching species. The hindwings of Anchiornis were also shorter than those of Microraptor, and were made up of 12 to 13 flight feathers anchored to the tibia (lower leg) and 10 to 11 to the tarsus (upper foot). Also unlike Microraptor, the hindwing feathers were longest closer to the body, with the foot feathers being short and directed downward, almost perpendicular to the foot bones.

Unlike many other paravians, the feet of Anchiornis (except for the claws) were completely covered in feathers, though these were much shorter than the ones making up the hindwing. Some specimens have preserved scales on the toes, tarsus, and even lower leg (tibia), suggesting that scales existed beneath the feathers. The underside of the toes were formed into fleshy pads with distinct creases at the joints. The foot pads were covered in small, pebble-like scales. Scales were also present on the top of the feet but these are very hard to see in all known fossils.

=== Color ===
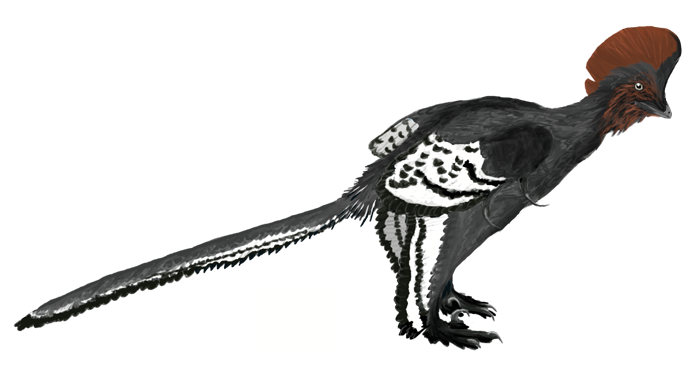
Life restoration based on the color pattern of the Beijing specimen

In 2010, a team of scientists examined numerous points among the feathers of an extremely well-preserved Anchiornis specimen in the Beijing Museum of Natural History to survey the distribution of melanosomes, the pigment cells that give feathers their color. By studying the types of melanosomes and comparing them with those of modern birds, the scientists were able to map the specific colors and patterning present on this Anchiornis when it was alive. Though this technique had been used and described for isolated bird feathers and portions of other dinosaurs (such as the tail of Sinosauropteryx), Anchiornis became the first Mesozoic dinosaur for which almost the entire life coloration was known (note that the tail of this specimen was not preserved). The study found that most of the body feathers of this Anchiornis specimen were gray and black. The crown feathers were mainly rufous with a gray base and front, and the face had rufous speckles among predominantly black head feathers. The forewing and hindwing feathers were white with black tips. The coverts (shorter feathers covering the bases of the long wing feathers) were gray, contrasting the mainly white main wings. The larger coverts of the wing were also white with gray or black tips, forming rows of darker dots along mid-wing. These took the form of dark stripes or even rows of dots on the outer wing (primary feather coverts) but a more uneven array of speckles on the inner wing (secondary coverts). The shanks of the legs were gray other than the long hindwing feathers, and the feet and toes were black.

In 2015, a second Anchiornis fossil at the Yizhou Fossil & Geology Park was subjected to a similar study that included a survey of melanosome shapes across all the feathers. In contrast to the 2010 study, only gray-black type melanosomes were found. Even when the crown feathers were examined, none of the rounder, rufous-type melanosomes were seen. The scientists who conducted this second study suggested several possible explanations for this discrepancy. First, the different preservation of melanosomes or different investigative techniques might have influenced the results of the original study. Second, because the Beijing Museum specimen was smaller, it is possible that the rufous color was replaced as these animals aged. Third, it is possible that there were regional differences or even different species of Anchiornis which had different color patterns in their plumage.

== Classification ==
- Pennaraptora
  - †Oviraptorosauria
  - Paraves
    - - †Scansoriopterygidae
      - - †Xiaotingia
        - †Yixianosaurus
    - - - - †Pedopenna
          - †Aurornis
        - - †Serikornis
          - †Eosinopteryx
      - - †Anchiornis
        - Eumaniraptora
          - - †Troodontidae
            - †Dromaeosauridae
          - Avialae

Cladogram following the results of a phylogenetic study by Lefèvreet al., 2017.

When it was first discovered, the scientists who studied Anchiornis conducted a phylogenetic analysis and concluded that it was an early member of the group Avialae, along with Archaeopteryx. Members of Avialae, called avialans, are all more closely related to modern birds than they are to dromaeosaurid and troodontid dinosaurs, though the earliest and most primitive members of all three groups are extremely similar to each other, which makes it difficult to sort out exactly which of these three main paravian branches they belong to.

The second specimen of Anchiornis was more complete than the first, and preserved several features which led Hu Dongyu and his colleagues to reclassify Anchiornis as a troodontid. Several more studies using similar analyses have also found Anchiornis to be a troodontid, though there have been exceptions. One study found Anchiornis to be a member of Archaeopterygidae, and it along with Archaeopteryx were considered more primitive than dromeosaurids, troodontids, or avialans. In 2015, Sankar Chatterjee placed Anchiornis along with Microraptor and other four-winged paravians in a group he called "Tetrapterygidae", just outside the Avialae, though this was not supported with a phylogenetic analysis. More comprehensive studies suggested that Anchiornis may have been an avialan after all, though new finds and updated versions of the same study later reversed this finding, concluding that Anchiornis was most likely a basal member of the clade Paraves, just outside the clade that includes dromaeosaurids, troodontids, and avialans.

In a 2017 re-evaluation of the Haarlem Archaeopteryx specimen, Anchiornis was found to be in a group with other genera, like Eosinopteryx, Xiaotingia, and was placed in the family Anchiornithidae along with other relatives.

== Paleobiology ==
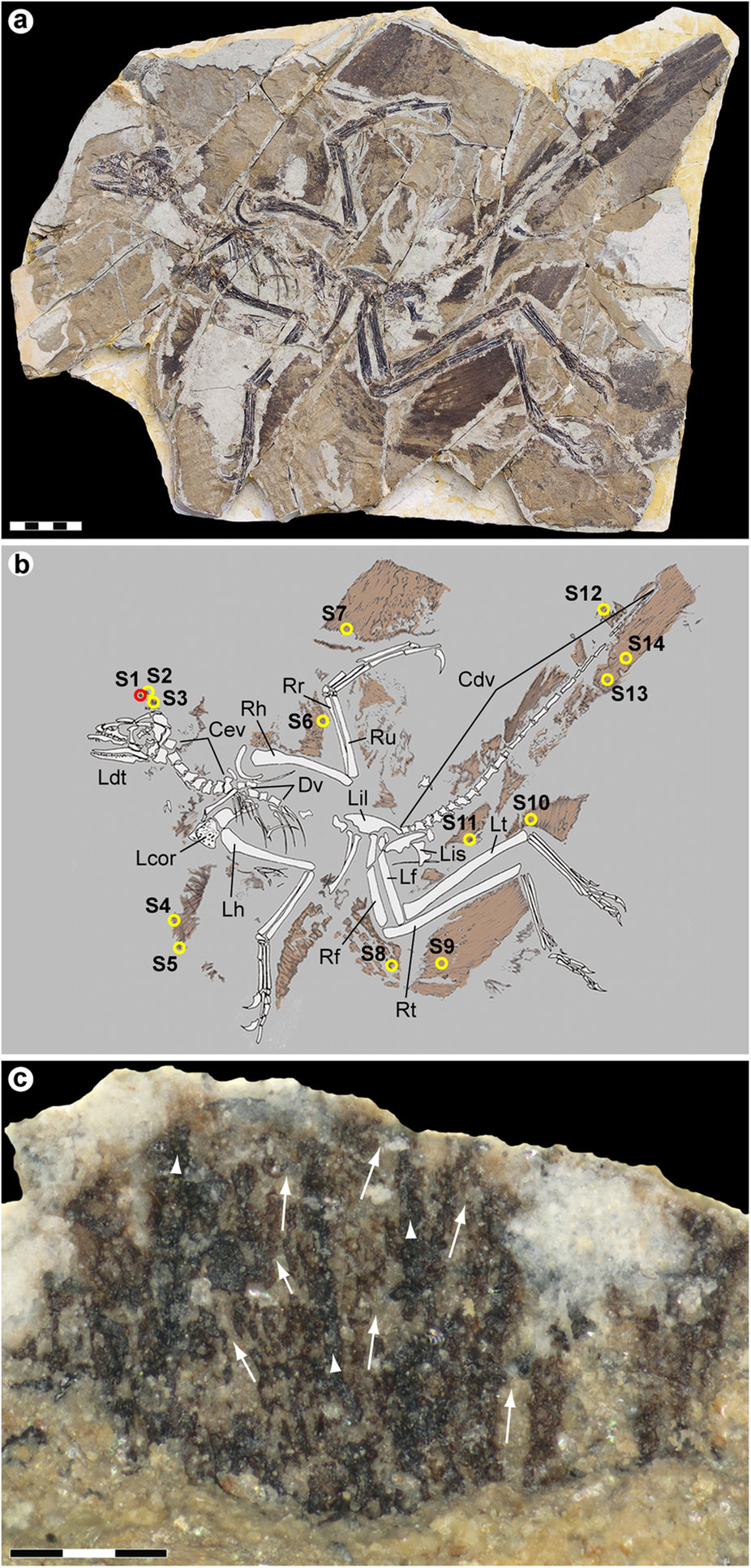
Photograph of specimen YTGP-T5199 and diagram showing plumage

Like many modern birds, Anchiornis exhibited a complex pattern of coloration with different colors in speckled patterns across the body and wings, or "within- and among-feather plumage coloration." In modern birds, such color patterning is used in communication and display, either to members of the same species (e.g. for mating or territorial threat display) or to threaten and warn off competing or predatory species.

=== Disputed flight capability ===
Anchiornis is notable for its proportionally long forelimbs, which measured 80% of the total length of the hindlimbs. This is similar to the condition in early avians such as Archaeopteryx, and the authors pointed out that long forelimbs are necessary for flight. Anchiornis also had a more avian wrist than other non-avialan theropods. The authors initially speculated that it would have been possible for Anchiornis to fly or glide. However, further finds showed that the wings of Anchiornis, while well-developed, were short when compared to later species like Microraptor, with relatively short primary feathers that had rounded, symmetrical tips, unlike the pointed, aerodynamically proportioned feathers of Microraptor.

A 2016 study of potential flight performance in early paravians concluded that while juvenile Anchiornis specimens may have been able to use their wings to assist running up an incline, and could possibly have achieved flapping flight if a very high-angle flapping wing stroke was used, the larger adult specimens would not have gained any aerodynamic benefit from their wings—they were simply too heavy compared to their total wing area. The same study found that flapping the wings while running would have resulted in a small (10%) increase to its running speed. Similarly, use of the wings during leaping would have resulted in a 15 to 20% increase in height and distance. Notably, Anchiornis seems to have lacked a breastbone (sternum), which may have been made of cartilage rather than bone, as in more primitive theropods.

In 2025, Kiat and colleagues examined nine specimens which preserved 20-28 primary feathers and three series of primary covert feathers, which were different from modern volant (flight-capable) birds that have 9-11 primary feathers two series of primary coverts. They determined that the wings of Anchiornis lacked symmetry and grew inconsistently, suggesting that it performed irregular moulting similar to that of secondarily flightless birds, which is different from sequential moulting by modern volant birds and some non-avian pennaraptorans (i.e. Microraptor and confuciusornithiforms), indicating that Anchiornis was also probably flightless.

=== Cursoriality ===
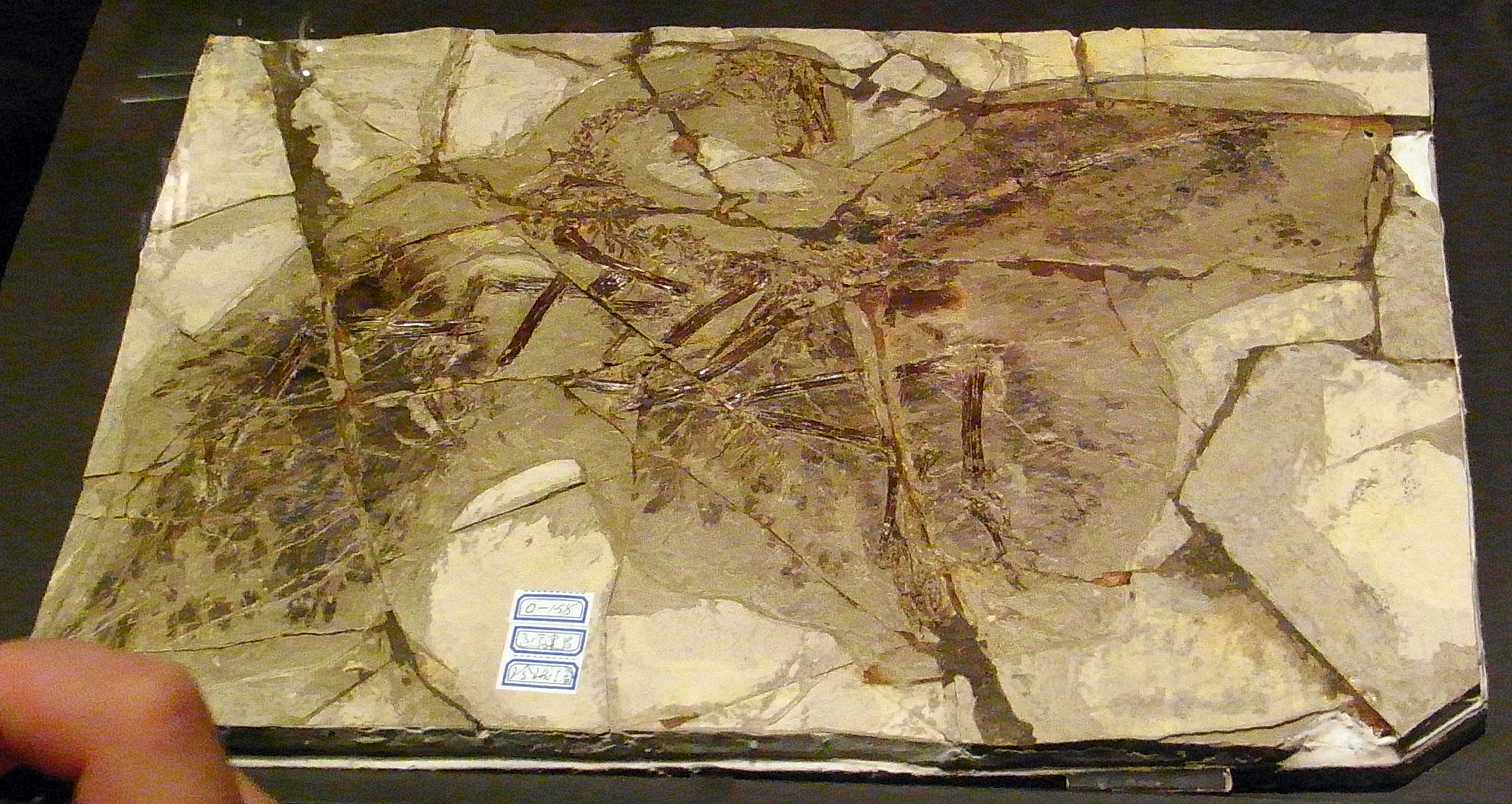
Fossil exhibited in Japan

Anchiornis has hindleg proportions more like those of more primitive theropod dinosaurs than avialans, with long legs indicating a fast-running lifestyle. However, while long legs normally indicate a fast runner, the legs and even feet and toes of Anchiornis were covered in feathers, including long feathers on the legs, similar to those in the hindwings of Microraptor. Long leg feathers on the lower legs may have slowed the running speed of Anchiornis. In modern birds, especially those that live on the ground, the lower legs tend to show reduction or even loss of feathers. The hind wings of Anchiornis were smaller and made of more curved, symmetrical feathers than those of Microraptor, suggesting that they were used mainly for display rather than flight. However, they might still have granted the animal some kind of aerodynamic advantage, even if their primary purpose was for display or some other function.

The skeletal structure of Anchiornis is similar to Eosinopteryx, which appears to have been a capable runner due to its uncurved rear claws and absence of flight feathers on its tail or lower legs. Anchiornis shared a similar body plan and the same ecosystem as Eosinopteryx, suggesting different niches and a complex picture for the origin of flight.

=== Diet and feeding ===
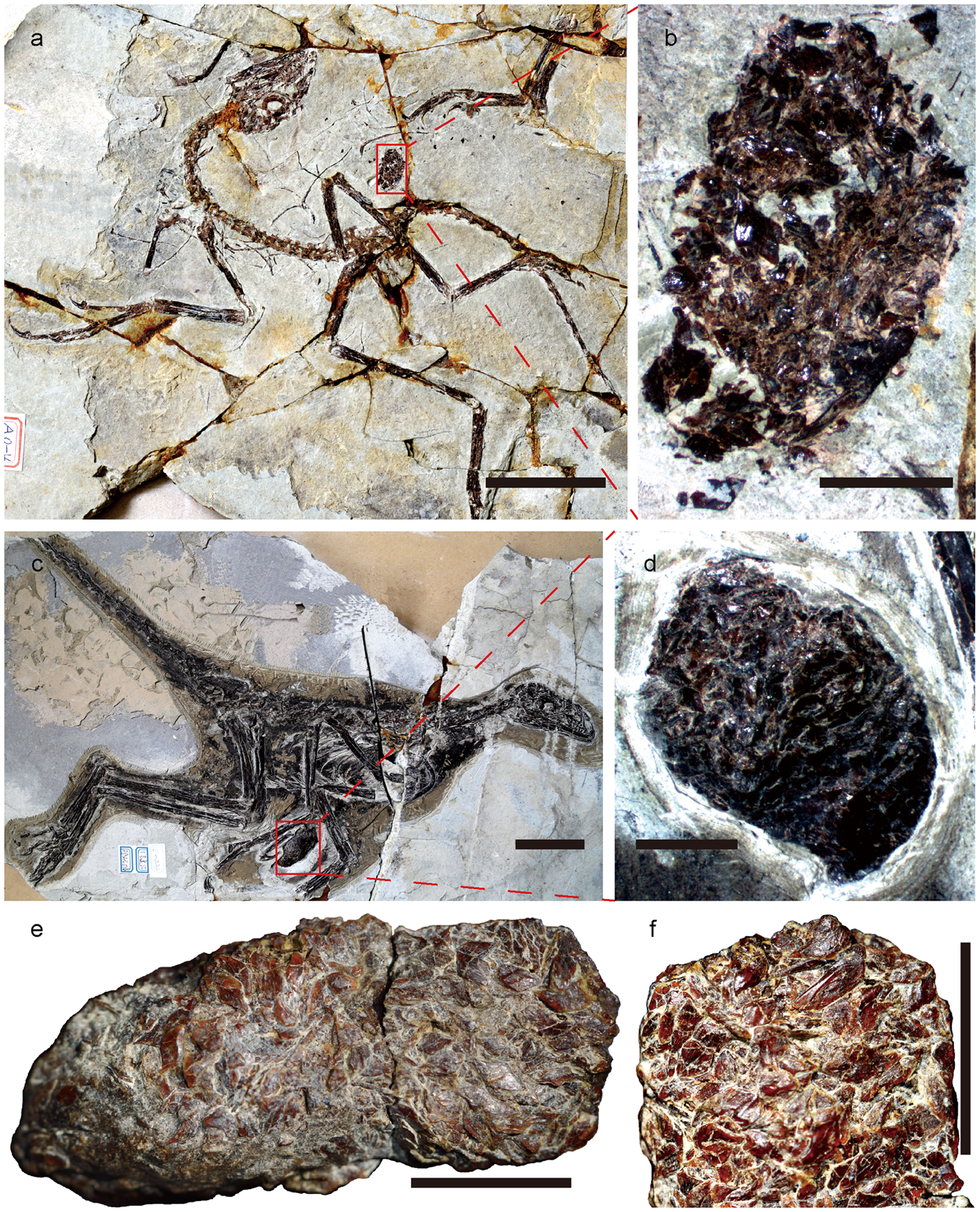
Specimens with gastric pellets

A 2018 study reported gastric pellets in association with Anchiornis specimens; some of the Anchiornis were even preserved with pellets still inside their bodies. Anchiornis is the earliest theropod known to have produced pellets. The pellets contained lizard bones and ptycholepid fish scales.

== See also ==
- Aurornis
- Dinosaur coloration
- Smallest organisms
