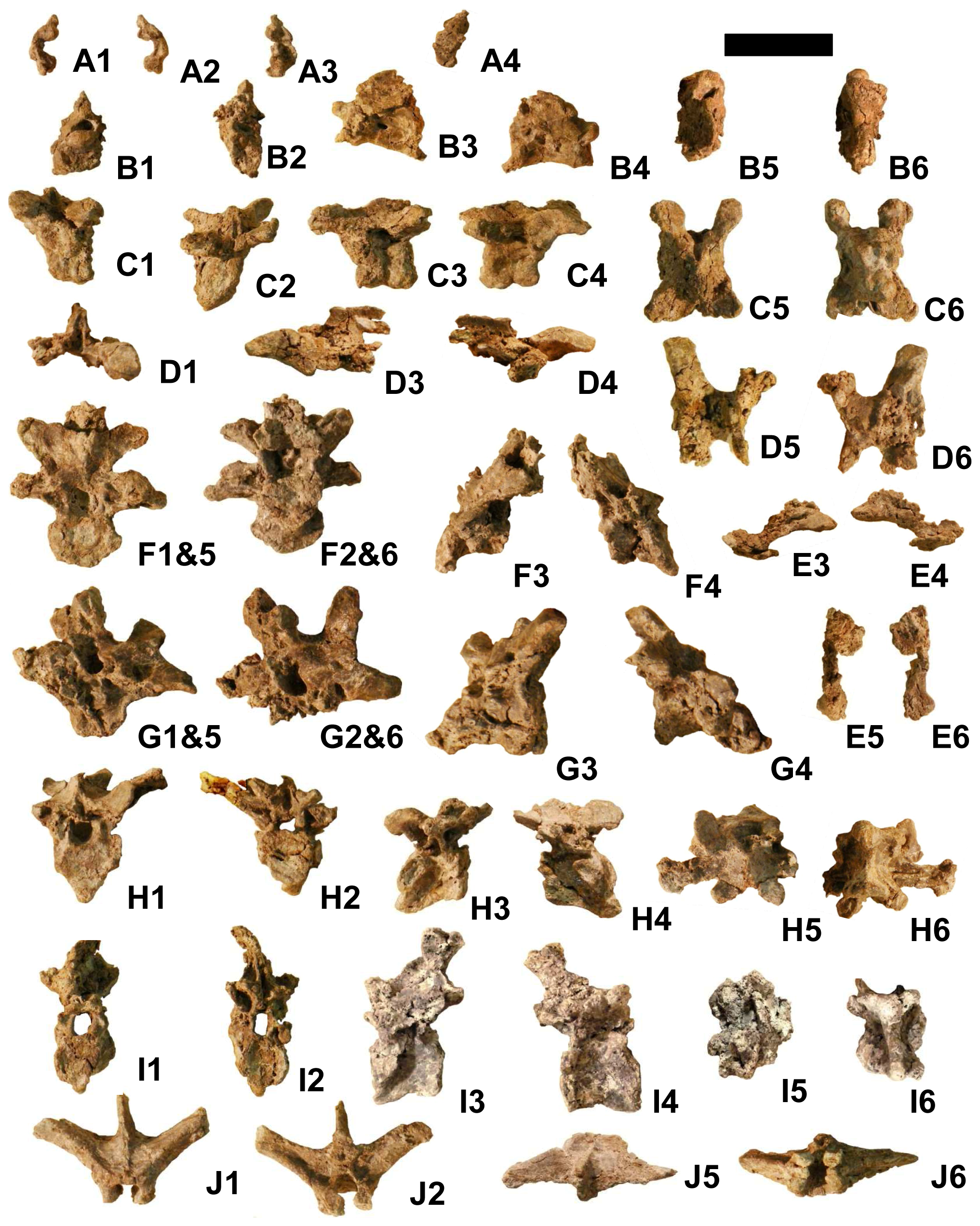
- Cervical and dorsal vertebrae of holotype UMNH VP 20211

Scientific classification
- Kingdom: Animalia
- Phylum: Chordata
- Class: Reptilia
- Clade: Dinosauria
- Clade: Saurischia
- Clade: Theropoda
- Family: †Dromaeosauridae
- Clade: †Eudromaeosauria
- Subfamily: †Dromaeosaurinae
- Genus: †Yurgovuchia; Senter et al. 2012

Type species
- †Yurgovuchia doellingi Senter et al. 2012

= Yurgovuchia =

Yurgovuchia Temporal range: Early Cretaceous, 139–134.6 Ma

Extinct genus of dinosaurs

Yurgovuchia (meaning "coyote") is a genus of dromaeosaurid theropod dinosaurs that lived in North America during the Early Cretaceous period in what is now the Cedar Mountain Formation. It contains a single species, Yurgovuchia doellingi. The remains were discovered in Utah, United States.

== Discovery and naming ==
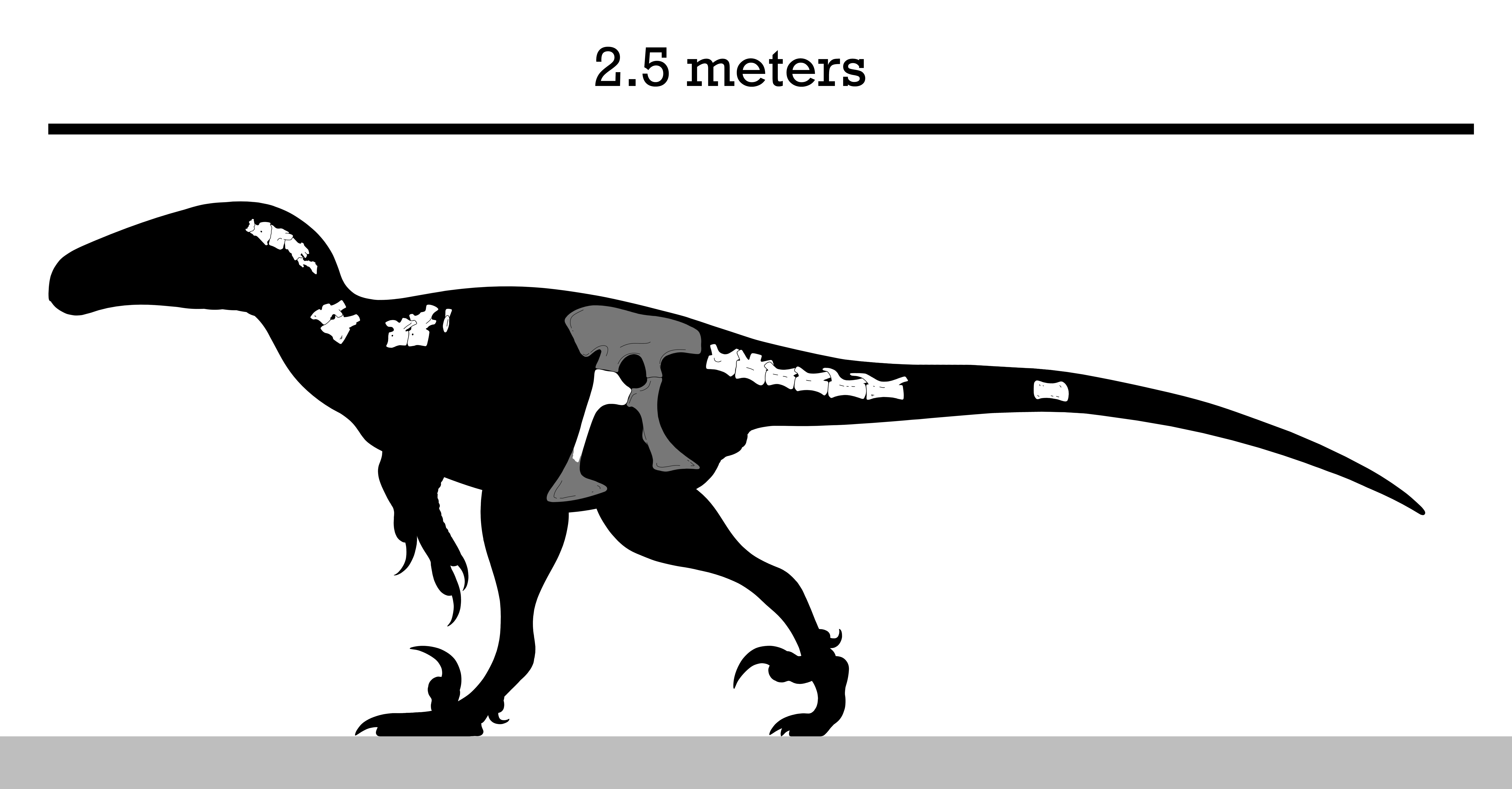
Skeletal composite showing the known fossil elements of Y. doellingi

The holotype was collected by Donald D. DeBlieux in 2005, from Don's Place, part of the Doelling's Bowl bone bed in Grand County, Utah. This bone bed is in the lower Yellow Cat Member of the Cedar Mountain Formation, dating probably to the Valanginian stage of the Early Cretaceous period, about 139–134.6 million years ago. Yurgovuchia was first described and named by Phil Senter, James I. Kirkland, Donald D. DeBlieux, Scott Madsen and Natalie Toth in 2012 and the type species is Yurgovuchia doellingi.

The generic name is derived from the Ute word yurgovuch, meaning coyote, a predator of similar size to Y. doellingi which currently inhabits the same region. The specific name, doellingi, honors the geologist Helmut Doelling, for his 50-plus years of geological research and mapping of Utah for the Utah Geological Survey and for causing the discovery of the Doelling's Bowl dinosaur sites, in which Y. doellingi was collected.

== Description ==
Yurgovuchia is known only from a single individual represented by an associated partial postcranial skeleton. The holotype and the only known specimen, UMNH VP 20211, includes cervical, dorsal, and caudal vertebrae as well as the proximal end of a left pubis. The preserved vertebrae are fused, indicating that the specimen was an adult at the time of death and not a juvenile specimen of Utahraptor. Instead of this, it represents a smaller and different species of dromaeosaurid, with an estimated size of 2.5 m (8.2 ft).

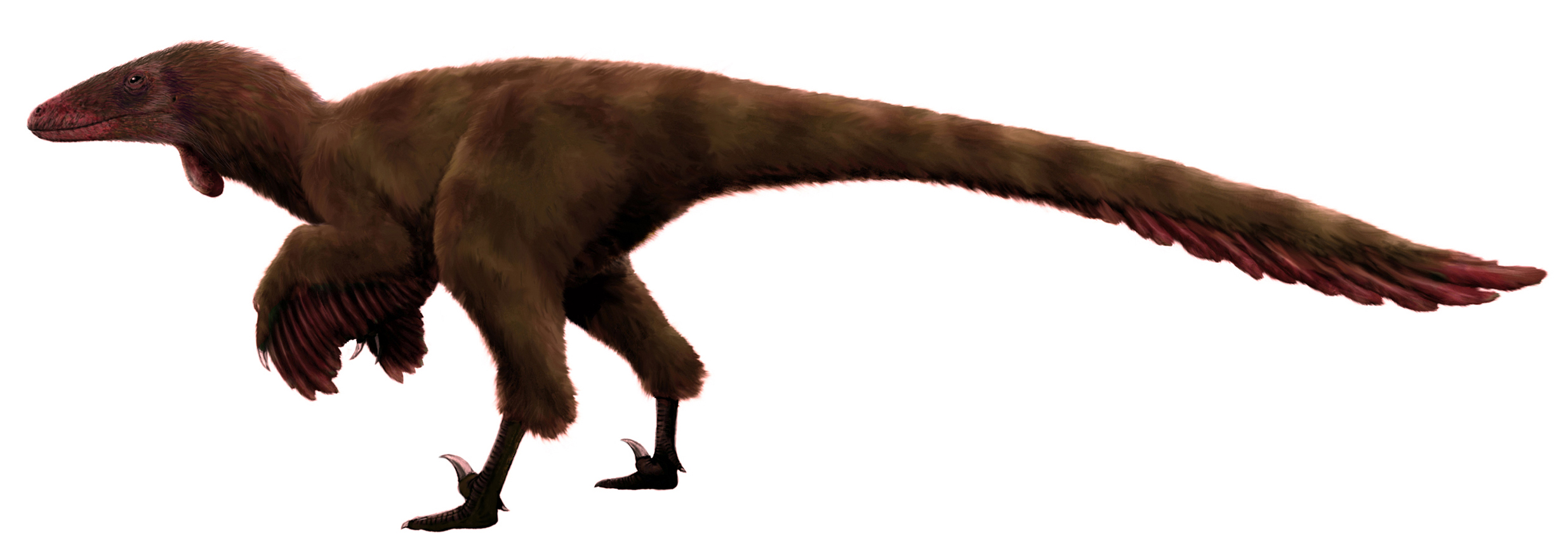
Life restoration of an individual

According to its describers in 2012, Yurgovuchia can be recognized from other dromaeosaurid taxa by the following characteristics: each side of the axial centrum have a single pneumatopore, third cervical vertebra with cranial end of the centrum not beveled, cervical prezygapophyses is flexed, cervical vertebrae epipophyses is above the postzygapophyseal facets, the pubis lacks pubic tubercle, the cranial faces of the centrum of caudal vertebrae are round, the cervical and dorsal vertebrae preserve hypapophyses without pneumatopores, the caudal prezygapophyses is distally elongated to the transition point, but not surpassing the length of a centrum.

== Classification ==
According to the phylogenetic analysis performed by its describers in 2012, Yurgovuchia represents advanced dromaeosaurines, closely related to Achillobator, Dromaeosaurus and Utahraptor. Below are the results obtained:

- Eudromaeosauria
  - - Bambiraptor
  - - Velociraptorinae
      - Adasaurus
      - - Tsaagan
        - Velociraptor
    - Dromaeosaurinae
      - Deinonychus
      - - Achillobator
        - Dromaeosaurus
        - Utahraptor
        - Yurgovuchia

== Paleoecology ==
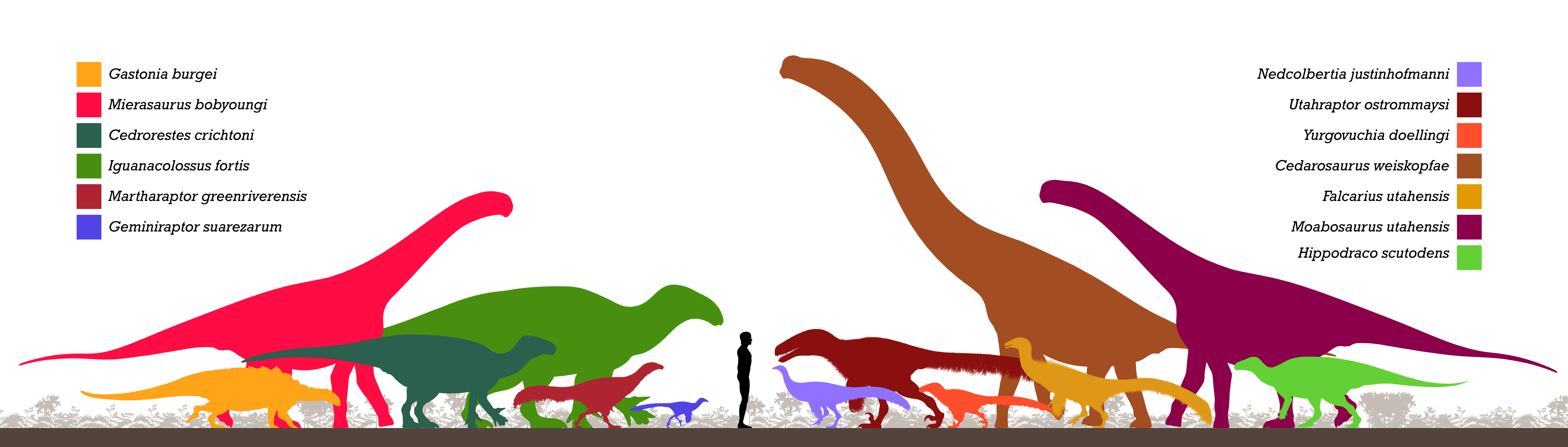
Yurgovuchia compared to the fauna of the Yellow Cat Member from the Cedar Mountain Formation (Yurgovuchia in salmon)

Other dinosaurs are also known from Don's Place including the iguanodontians Iguanacolossus, polacanthines, and velociraptorine dromaeosaurids represented by a pubis (UMNH VP 21752) and a tentative radius (UMNH VP 21751). Many additional theropods have previously been described from the Yellow Cat Member, including the therizinosaur Falcarius and the small, predatory troodontids Geminiraptor from the lower part of the member, in addition, the large dromaeosaurines Utahraptor, small ornithomimosaurs Nedcolbertia, and unnamed eudromaeosaurs represented by a tail skeleton (UMNH VP 20209) from the upper part of the member.

Yurgovuchia shared its environment and lived alongside other dinosaurs in the Lower Yellow Cat, such as the theropods Falcarius and Geminiraptor, the sauropod Mierasaurus and the large iguanodontians Iguanacolossus. There are also indeterminate goniopholidid crocodiles and the unnamed velociraptorines known from the Lower Yellow Cat.

== See also ==
- Timeline of dromaeosaurid research
- Cedar Mountain Formation
