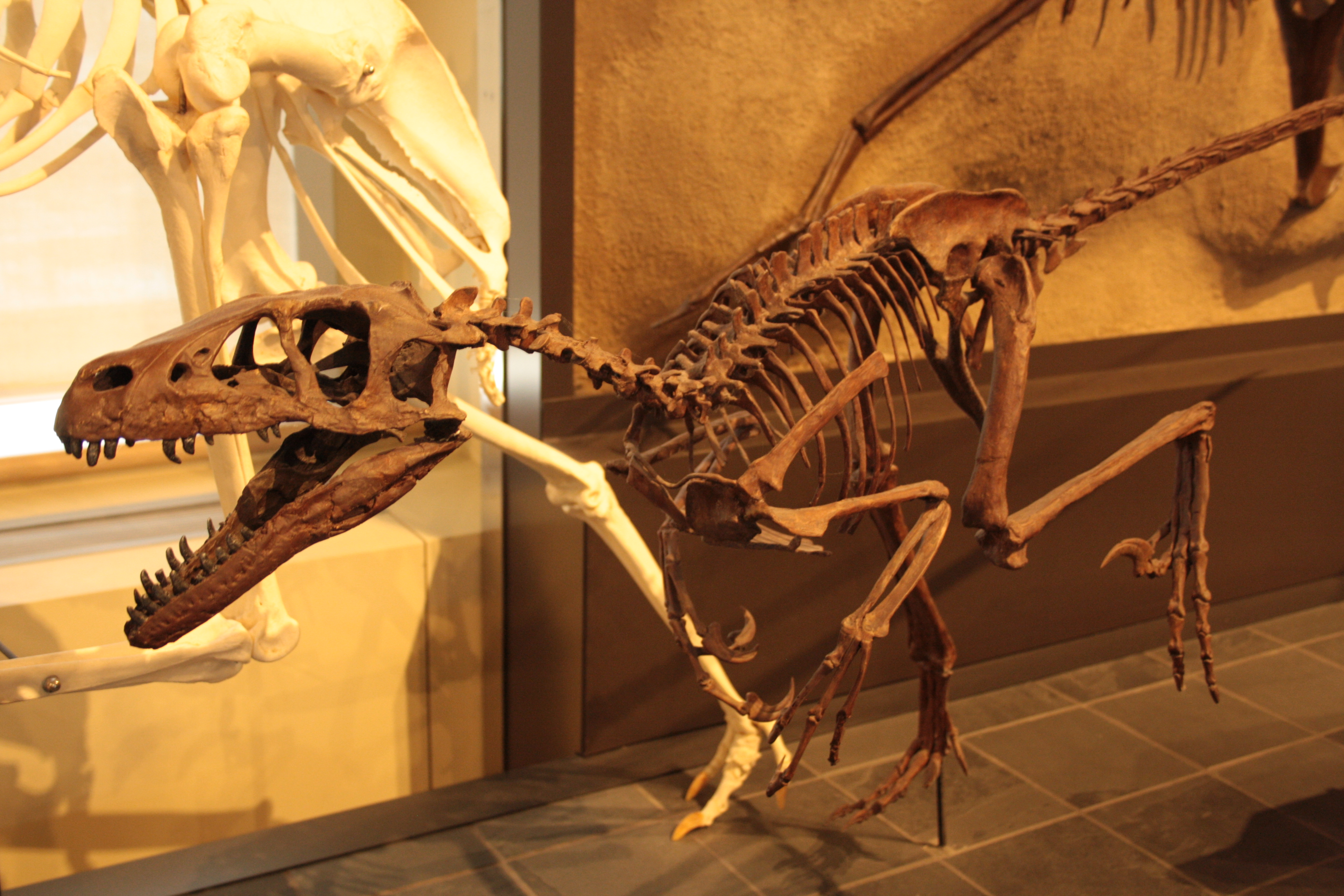
- Reconstructed skeleton, Canadian Museum of Nature

Scientific classification
- Kingdom: Animalia
- Phylum: Chordata
- Class: Reptilia
- Clade: Dinosauria
- Clade: Saurischia
- Clade: Theropoda
- Family: †Dromaeosauridae
- Clade: †Eudromaeosauria
- Subfamily: †Dromaeosaurinae
- Genus: †Dromaeosaurus; Matthew & Brown, 1922

Type species
- †Dromaeosaurus albertensis Matthew & Brown, 1922

= Dromaeosaurus =

Dromaeosaurus Temporal range: Late Cretaceous (Campanian to Maastrichtian), 83.6–68 Ma Possible Late Maastrichtian record

Extinct genus of dinosaurs

Dromaeosaurus (/ˌdroʊmiəˈsɔːrəs, -mi.oʊ-/; lit. 'running lizard') is a genus of dromaeosaurid theropod dinosaur that lived during the Late Cretaceous period (middle to late Campanian and Maastrichtian), sometime between 80 and 69 million years ago, in the Canadian province of Alberta and the western United States. The type species is Dromaeosaurus albertensis, which was described by William Diller Matthew and Barnum Brown in 1922. Its fossils were unearthed in the Hell Creek Formation, Horseshoe Canyon Formation and Dinosaur Park Formation. Teeth attributed to this genus have been found in the Prince Creek Formation. Dromaeosaurus is the type genus of both Dromaeosauridae and Dromaeosaurinae, which include many genera with similar characteristics to Dromaeosaurus such as possibly its closest relative Dakotaraptor. Dromaeosaurus was heavily built, more so than other dromaeosaurids that are similar in size, like Velociraptor.

== Discovery and naming ==
Despite receiving widespread attention in popular books on dinosaurs, and the usage of a complete mounted skeleton cast in museums throughout the world, Dromaeosaurus is poorly known from actual fossils. The preparation of the popular cast by the Tyrrell Museum was only made possible by knowledge gained from other dromaeosaurids that have been discovered more recently.

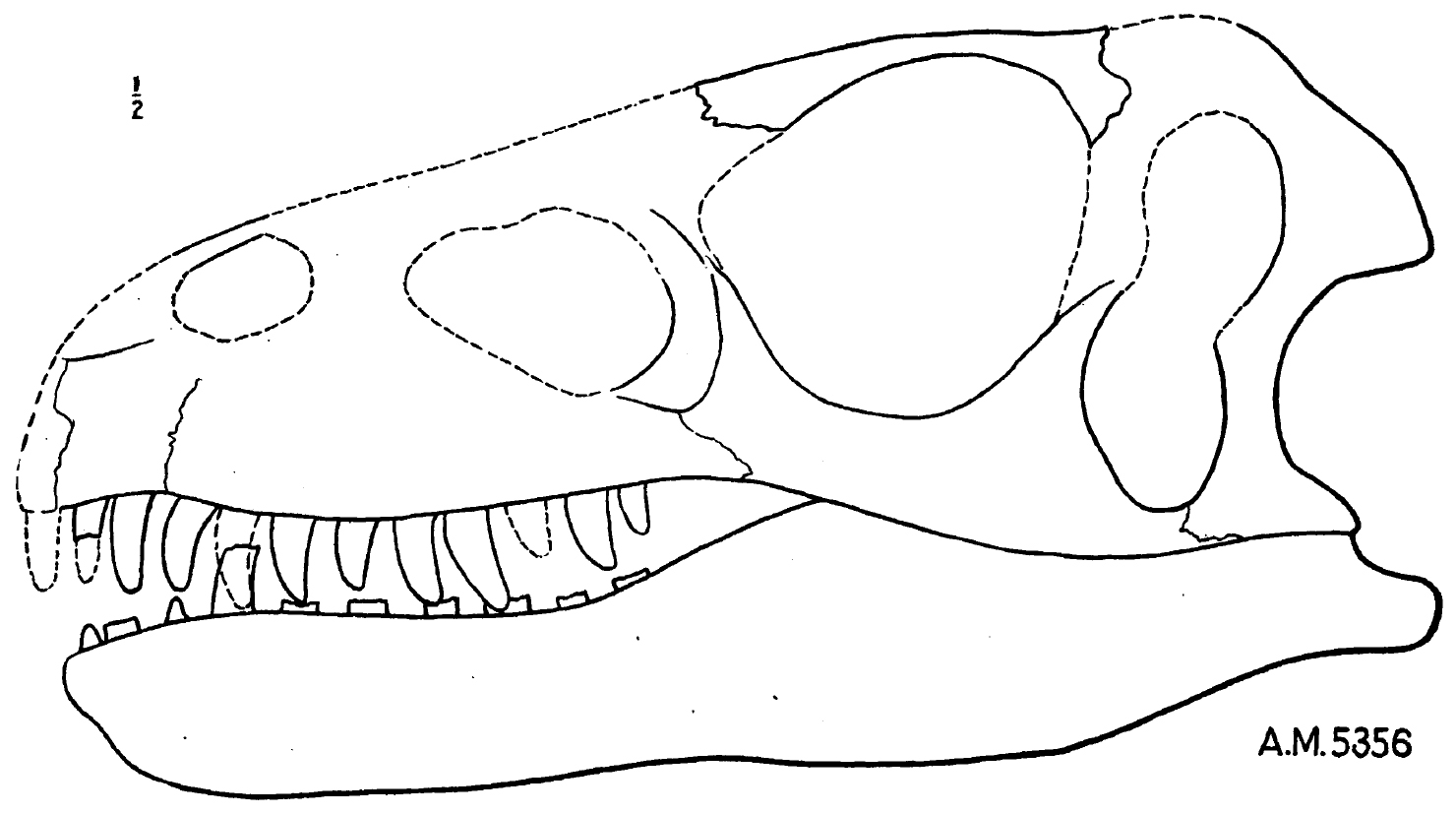
1922 diagram of the holotype skull

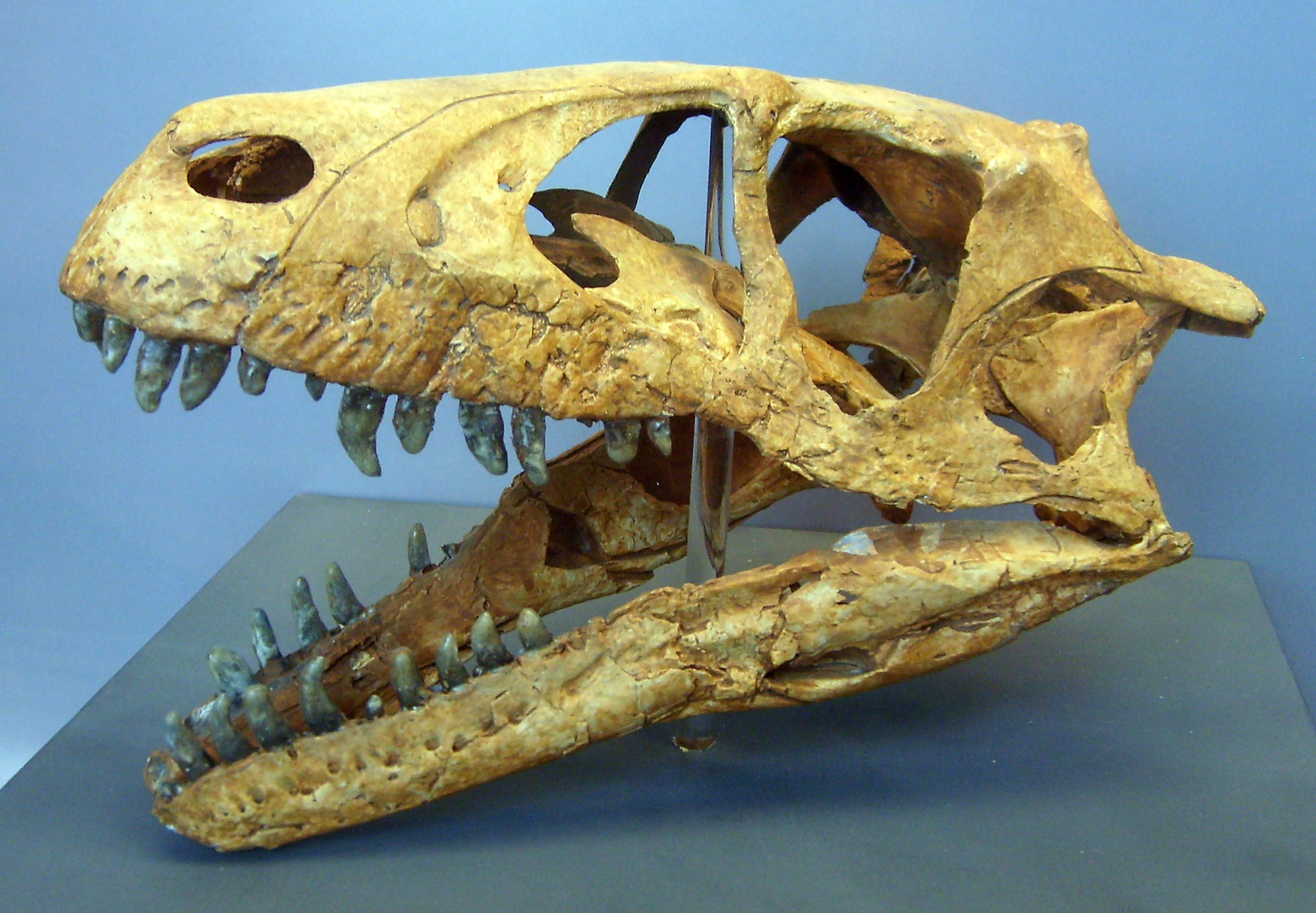
D. albertensis skull cast exhibited the University of Copenhagen Geological Museum

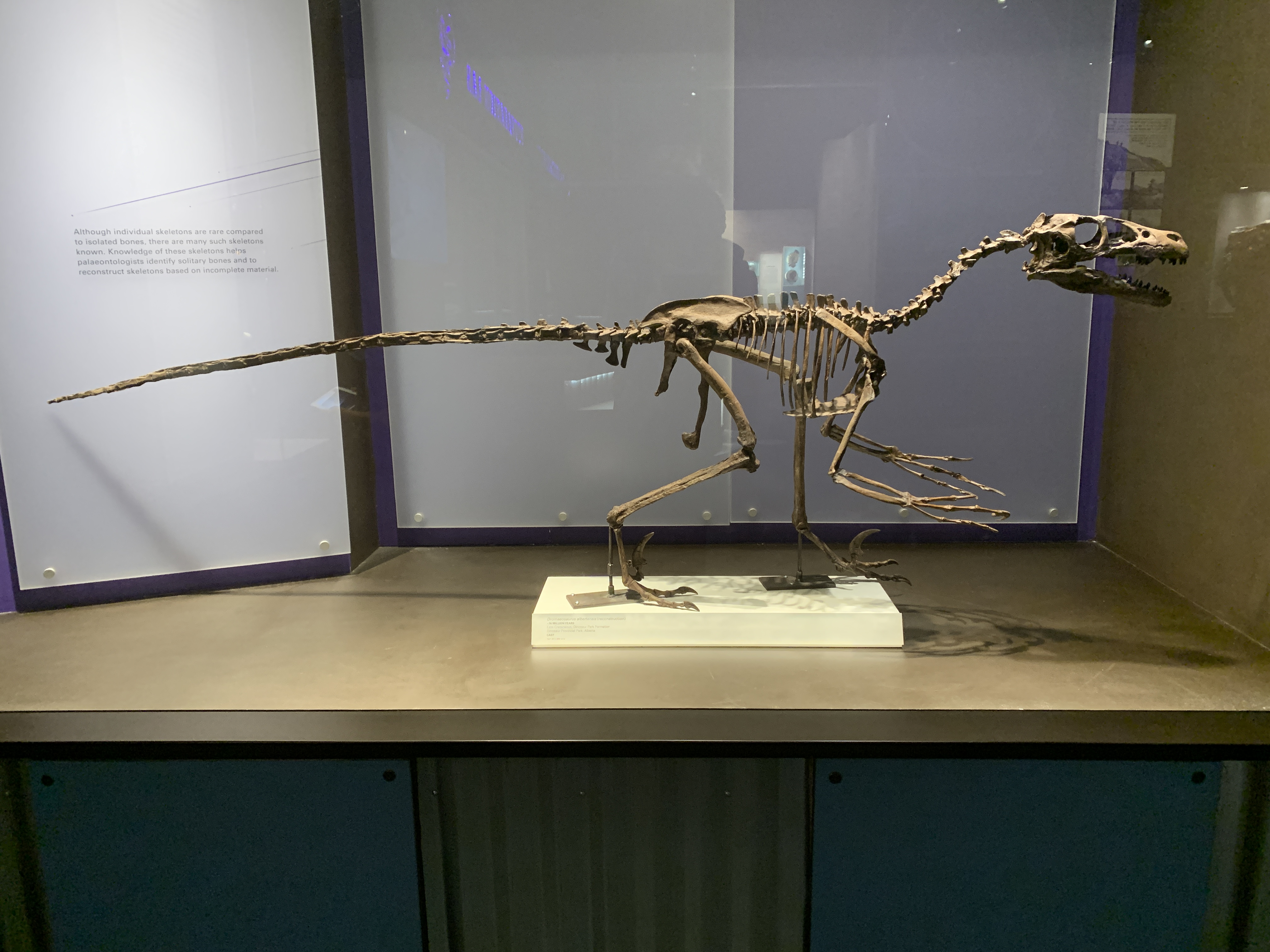
Cast at the Royal Tyrrell Museum

The first known Dromaeosaurus remains were discovered by paleontologist Barnum Brown during a 1914 expedition to Red Deer River on behalf of the American Museum of Natural History. The area where these bones were collected is now part of Dinosaur Provincial Park in Alberta, Canada. The find, holotype AMNH 5356, consisted of a partial skull 24 cm (9 1/2 in) in length, a mandible, two hyoids, a first metacarpal and some foot bones. The skull lacked most of the top of the snout. Several other skull fragments, and about thirty isolated teeth, are known from subsequent discoveries in Alberta and Montana.

In 1922 William Diller Matthew and Brown named and described the type species of Dromaeosaurus: Dromaeosaurus albertensis. The generic name is derived from the Greek δρομεύς (dromeus) meaning 'runner' and σαύρος (sauros) meaning 'lizard'. The specific name, "albertensis", refers to Alberta.

Another seven species of Dromaeosaurus were named: Dromaeosaurus laevifrons (Cope 1876) Matthew & Brown 1922; Dromaeosaurus cristatus (Cope 1876) Matthew & Brown 1922 (Troodon); Dromaeosaurus? gracilis (Marsh 1888) Matthew & Brown 1922; Dromaeosaurus explanatus (Cope 1876) Kuhn 1939; Dromaeosaurus minutus (Marsh 1892) Russell 1972 (an alvarezsaurid); Dromaeosaurus falculus (Cope 1876) Olshevsky 1979 and Dromaeosaurus mongoliensis (Barsbold 1983) Paul 1988 (Adasaurus). Most of them were based on fragmentary material, some belonging to other genera, and far less complete than that of Dromaeosaurus albertensis, and those that have not been reclassified are considered nomina dubia today. Nevertheless, it has grown apparent that Dromaeosaurus albertensis is even rarer in its habitat than other small theropods, although it was the first dromaeosaurid of which reasonably good cranial material was described. The genus Chirostenotes was considered to be synonymous with Dromaeosaurus at one point in time.

== Description ==
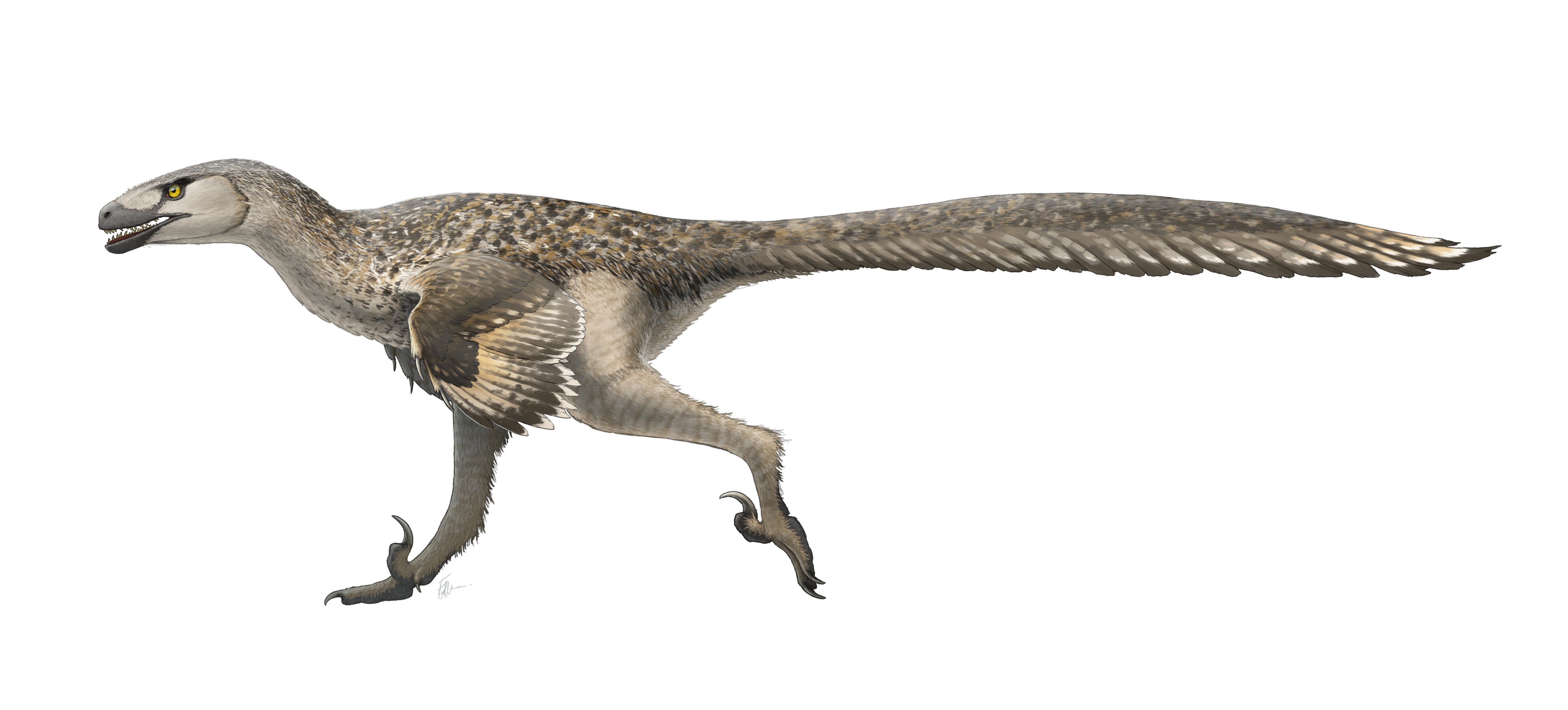
Artistic restoration of D. albertensis

Dromaeosaurus was a medium-sized carnivore, about 2 m (6 ft 7 in) in length and 16 kg (35 lb) in body mass. Its mouth was full of sharp teeth, and it probably would have had a sharply curved "sickle claw" on each foot. It lived during the Campanian stage of the Late Cretaceous. However, some fragmentary remains such as teeth that may belong to this genus have been found from the late Maastrichtian age Hell Creek and Lance Formations, dating to 66 million years ago. Teeth have also been found in the Aguja Formation.

Dromaeosaurus had a relatively robust skull with a deep snout. Its teeth were rather large and were shaped like a curved cone with a coat of enamel covering the crown. It had only nine teeth in each maxilla. Dromaeosaurus also had a vein at the back of the head, the vena capitis dorsalis, that drained the front neck muscles through two long canals running to the posterior surface of the brain. The Meckelian groove of Dromaeosaurus is rather shallow and does not have much depth.

== Classification ==
Matthew and Brown originally placed Dromaeosaurus to its own subfamily, the Dromaeosaurinae, within the "Deinodontidae" (now known as Tyrannosauridae) based on some similarities in the general proportions of the skull. In 1969, John H. Ostrom recognized that Dromaeosaurus shared many features with Velociraptor and the newly discovered Deinonychus, and assigned these forms to a new family: Dromaeosauridae. Since then, many new relatives of Dromaeosaurus have been found.

The exact relationships of Dromaeosaurus are somewhat unclear. Although its rugged build gives it a primitive appearance, it was actually a very specialized animal. In an analysis of the clade Dromaeosaurinae, species such as Utahraptor, Achillobator and Yurgovuchia have been recovered. The genus Dakotaraptor has been classified as the sister taxon to Dromaeosaurus, but more recent analysis do not recover such a close relationship.

Below is a cladogram by Senter et al. in 2012. Dromaeosaurus is recovered as the sister taxon to Yurgovuchia, Utahraptor and Achillobator.

- Eudromaeosauria
  - Bambiraptor
  - Velociraptorinae
    - Adasaurus
    - - Tsaagan
      - Velociraptor
  - Dromaeosaurinae
    - Deinonychus
    - - Achillobator
      - Dromaeosaurus
      - Utahraptor
      - Yurgovuchia

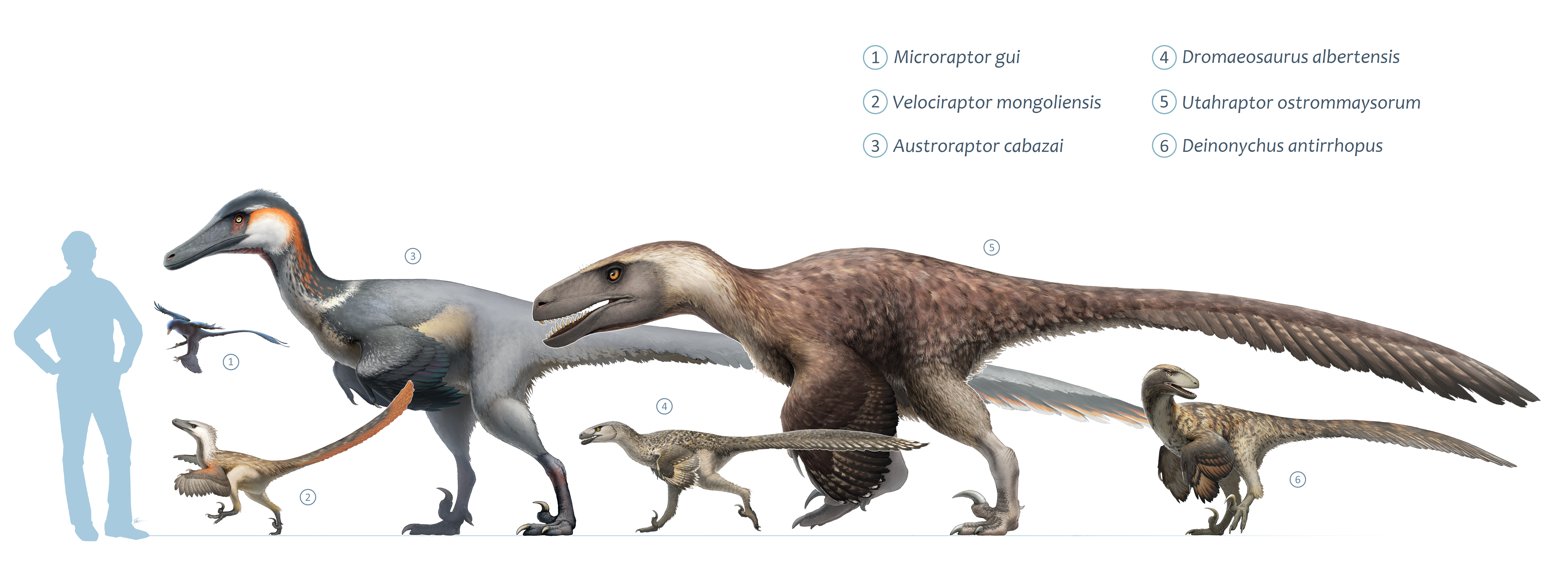
Size of Dromaeosaurus (4) compared with other dromaeosaurs

The cladogram below follows a 2015 analysis by paleontologists Robert DePalma, David Burnham, Larry Martin, Peter Larson, and Robert Bakker, using updated data from the Theropod Working Group. In this analysis, Dromaeosaurus is classified as the sister taxon of Dakotaraptor.

- Eudromaeosauria
  - Saurornitholestes
  - - Velociraptor
    - Dromaeosaurinae
      - Deinonychus
      - - Atrociraptor
        - - Achillobator
          - - Utahraptor
            - - Dakotaraptor
              - Dromaeosaurus

== Paleobiology ==
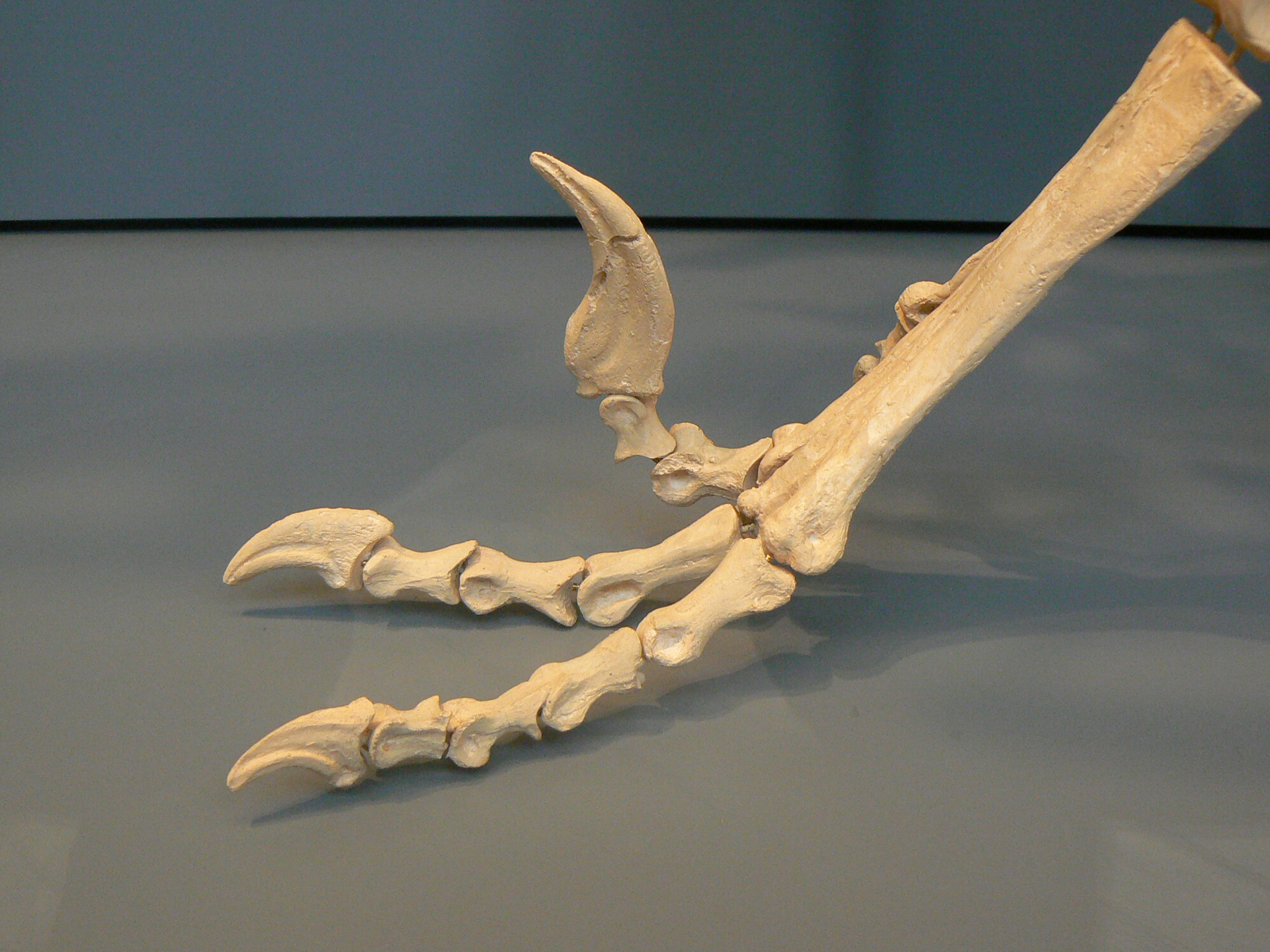
Conjectural sculpted foot of D. albertensis on display at the French National Museum of Natural History in Paris

Dromaeosaurus differs from most of its relatives in having a short, massive skull, a deep mandible, and robust teeth. The teeth tend to be more heavily worn than those of its relative Saurornitholestes, suggesting that its jaws were used for crushing and tearing rather than simply slicing through flesh. Therrien et al. (2005) estimated that Dromaeosaurus had a bite nearly three times as powerful as that of Velociraptor and suggested it relied more on its jaws than on the sickle claw to kill its prey. In a study predominantly centered around Shuvuuia, Dromaeosaurus was compared to the former and also to Alioramus, in which both Dromaeosaurus and Alioramus were discovered to be diurnal predators.

=== Feeding behavior ===
Dromaeosaurus' feeding habits were also discovered to be typical of coelurosaurian theropods, with a characteristic "puncture and pull" feeding method. Studies of wear patterns on the teeth of this animal by Angelica Torices et al. in a study regarding theropod feeding habits indicate that dromaeosaurid teeth share similar wear patterns to those seen in the Tyrannosauridae and Troodontidae, respectively. However, micro-wear on the teeth indicated that Dromaeosaurus likely preferred larger prey items than the troodontids it shared their environment with. Such differentiations in its diet likely allowed the theropod to inhabit the same environment as its more distant maniraptoran relatives. The same study also indicated that both Dromaeosaurus and Saurornitholestes (also analyzed in the study) likely included bone in their diet and were better adapted to handle the stresses associated with attacking struggling prey while troodontids, equipped with weaker jaws, preyed on softer animals and prey items such as invertebrates and carrion. This feeding strategy and ability to handle struggling prey was also a feature that the theropod also shared with tyrannosaurids such as Gorgosaurus, which was also analyzed in said study alongside these smaller theropods.

== See also ==
- Timeline of dromaeosaurid research
