= Timeline of dromaeosaurid research =

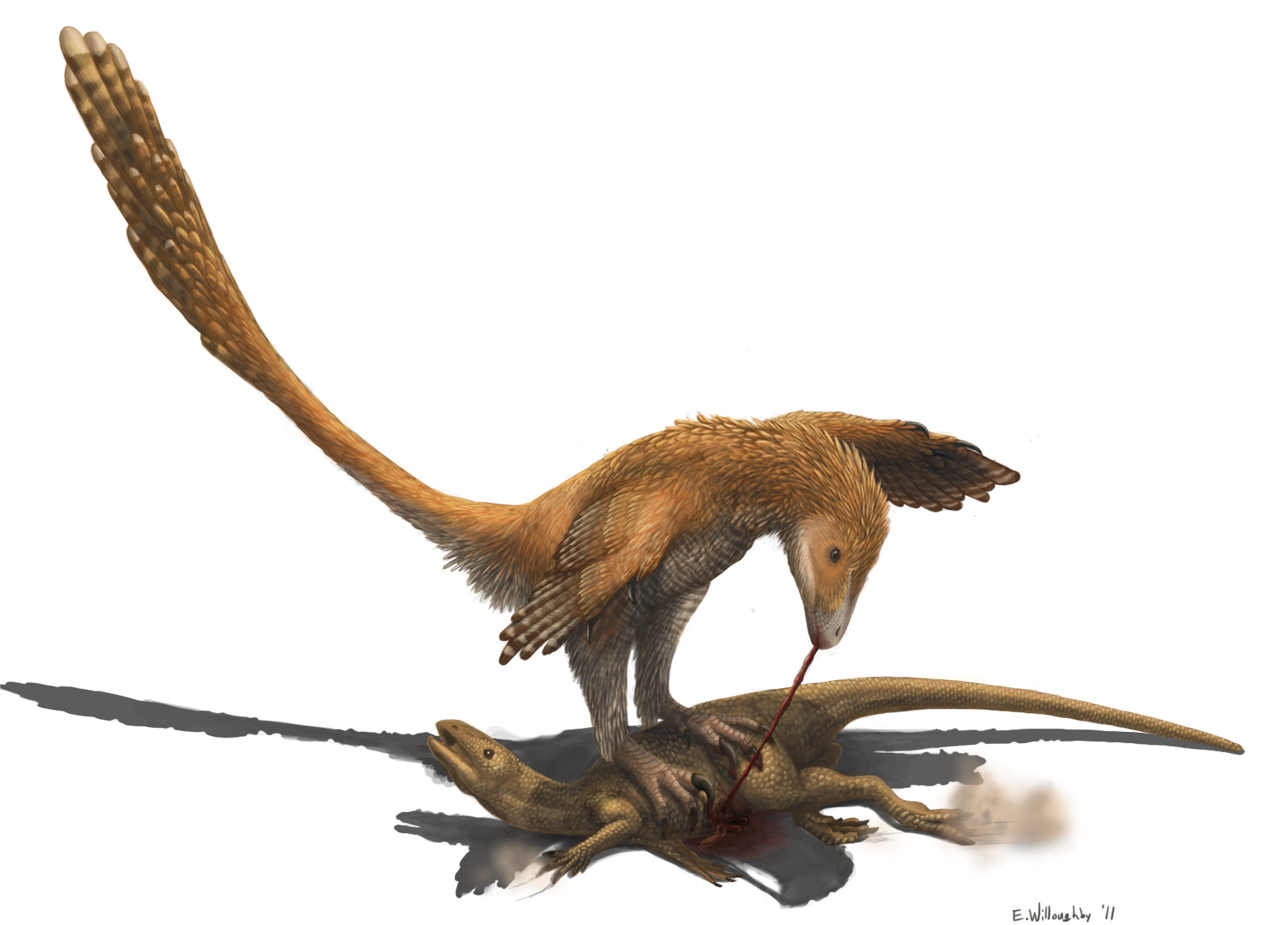
Artistic restoration of Deinonychus preying on Zephyrosaurus

This timeline of dromaeosaurid research is a chronological listing of events in the history of paleontology focused on the dromaeosaurids, a group of sickle-clawed, bird-like theropod dinosaurs including animals like Velociraptor. Since the Native Americans of Montana used the sediments of the Cloverly Formation to produce pigments, they may have encountered remains of the dromaeosaurid Deinonychus hundreds of years before these fossils came to the attention of formally trained scientists.

In 1922 Matthew and Brown named the new genus and species Dromaeosaurus albertensis, considering it a new type within the family Deinodontidae, a now-defunct family name that once applied to the tyrannosaurs. Not long after, Velociraptor was discovered in Mongolia by the Central Asiatic Expedition. Dromaeosaur research was fairly quiet until the 1960s, when John Ostrom described the new genus and species Deinonychus antirrhopus. This discovery played a major role in setting off the dinosaur renaissance because Deinonychus was obviously a vigorous, active animal, and exhibited characteristics linking it to the origin of birds. As such it brought support for controversial reinterpretations of dinosaurs as warm-blooded and ancestral to birds. Its distinct nature and similarity to Dromaeosaurus led Ostrom to follow Edwin Colbert and Dale Russel's suggestion that the Dromaeosaurinae be regarded as its own family separate from the Deinodontidae.

After Ostrom's initial research on Deinonychus, evidence continued to mount for a close evolutionary relationship between dromaeosaurids and birds. The dromaeosaurid Sinornithosaurus milennii, described in 1999 by Xu, Wang, and Wu, is a notable example as the fine-grained Chinese limestone from which it was collected preserved its life covering of feathers. Discoveries of feathered dromaeosaurids continued into the 2000s. Xu, Zhou, and Wang named the new genus Microraptor in 2000. Three years later, Xu and others would report a new species in this genus that exhibited a bizarre "four winged" body plan with long pennaceous flight feathers on both its front and hind limbs.

== Prescientific ==
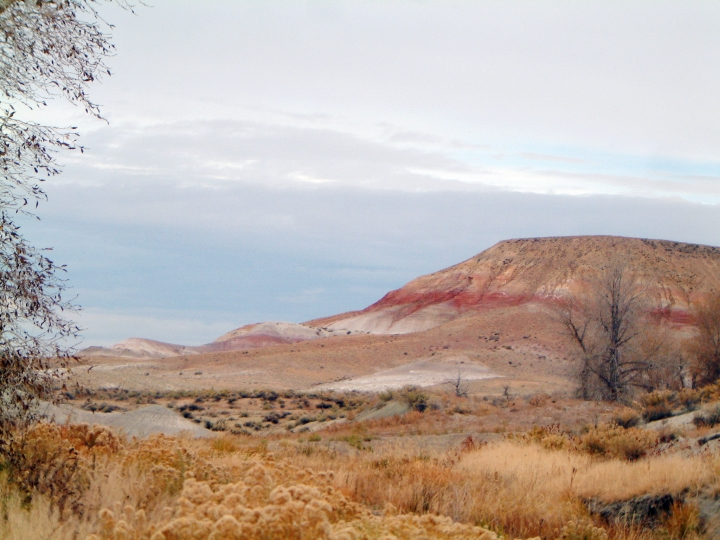
An outcrop of the Cloverly Formation

- The Crow people and other Native American groups inhabiting Montana used to use rocks from the Cloverly Formation to make red pigments. Since the red pigments are richest in the same layers of the formation that preserve dinosaur fossils, it is likely that Native Americans encountered Deinonychus fossils long before scientifically trained paleontologists.

== 19th century ==
=== 1880s ===
==== 1887 ====
- Harry Govier Seeley described the new species Ornithodesmus cluniculus.

== 20th century ==
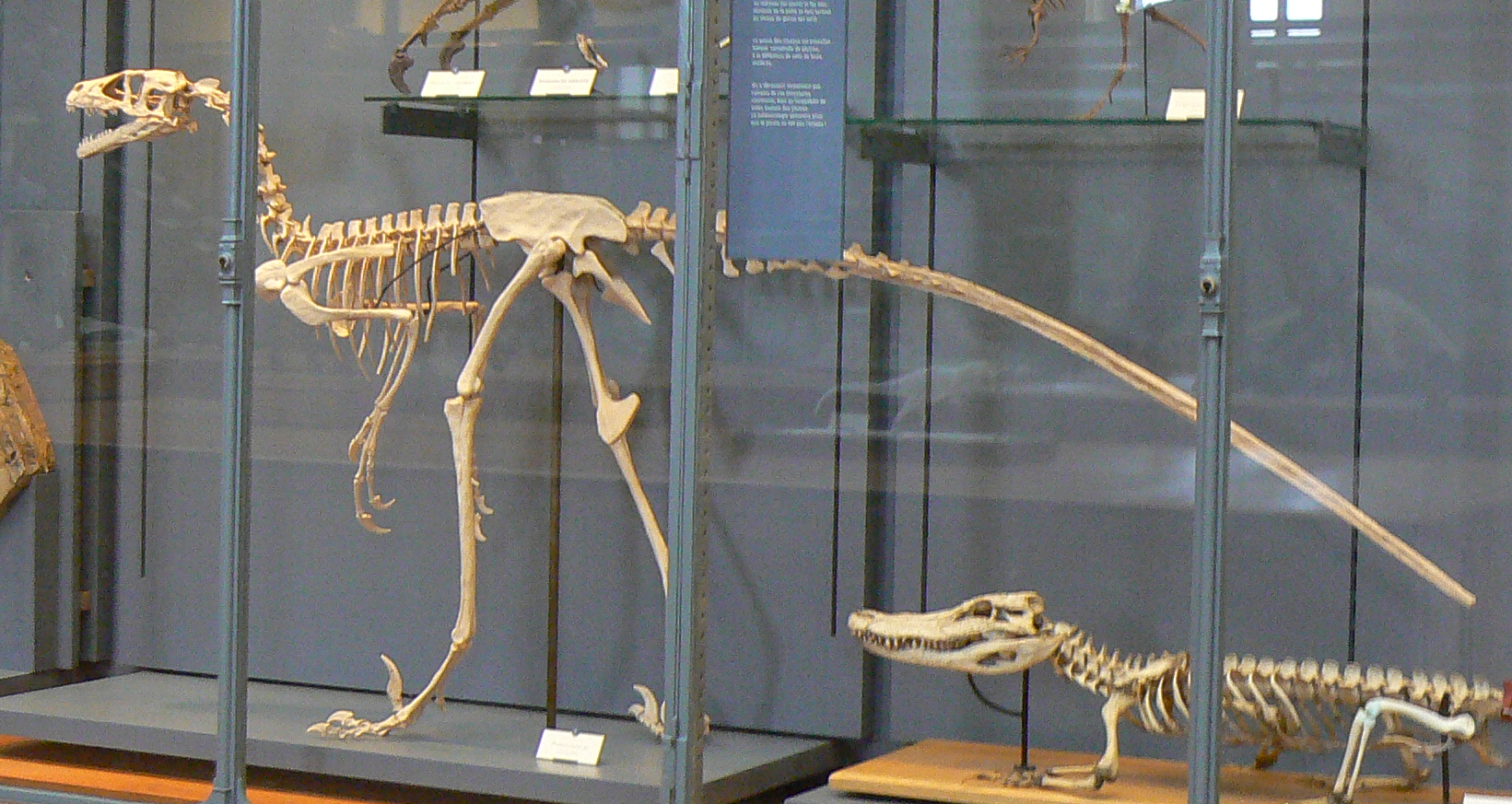
Skeletal reconstruction of Dromaeosaurus

=== 1910s ===
==== 1914 ====
- Barnum Brown collected a partial skull and foot in Late Cretaceous rocks that would later serve as the type specimen of Dromaeosaurus albertensis.

=== 1920s ===
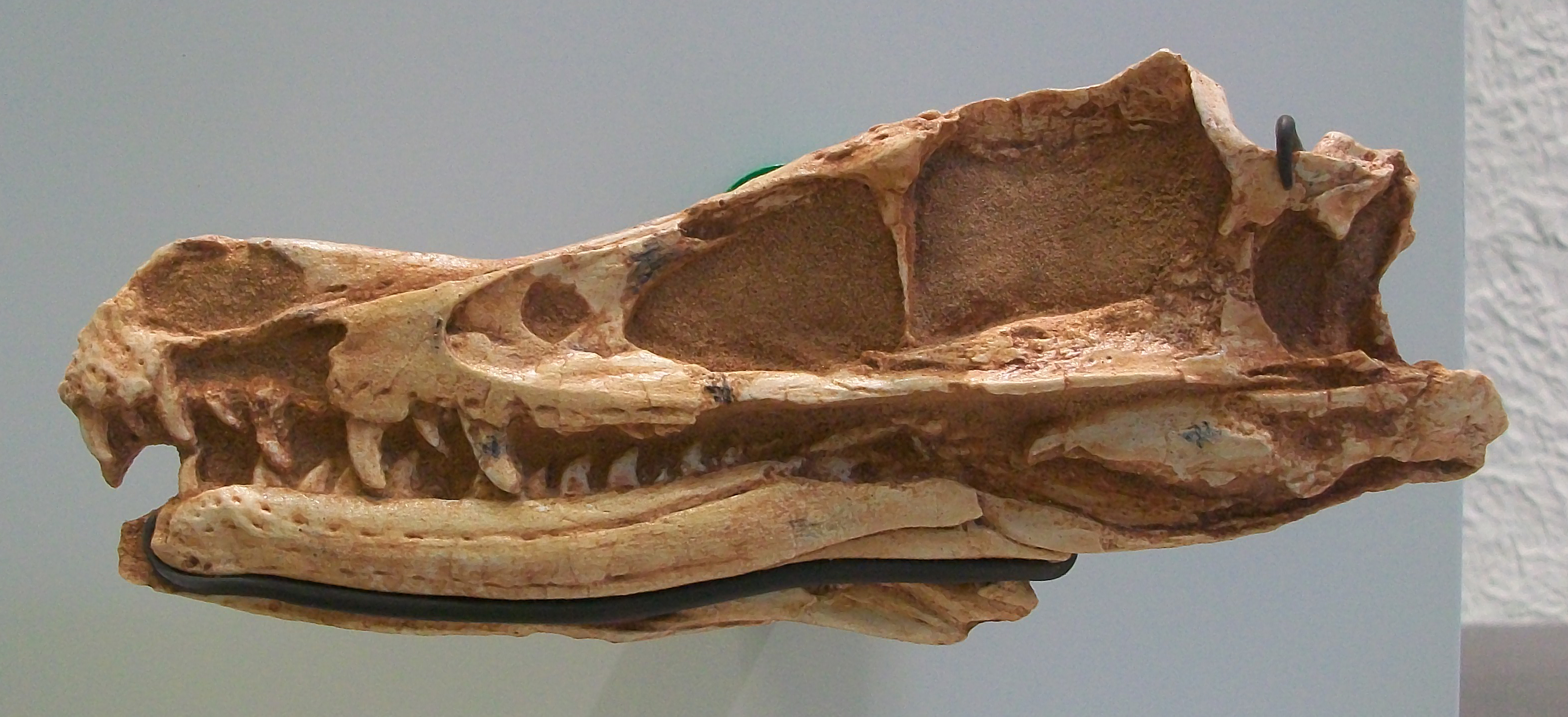
The type skull of Velociraptor mongoliensis

==== 1922 ====
- Matthew and Brown described the new genus and species Dromaeosaurus albertensis and named the Dromaeosauridae.

==== 1924 ====
- Henry Fairfield Osborn described the new genus and species Velociraptor mongoliensis.

==== 1926 ====
- Matthew and Brown first observed that the braincase of dromaeosaurids were large for reptiles of their body size.

=== 1960s ===
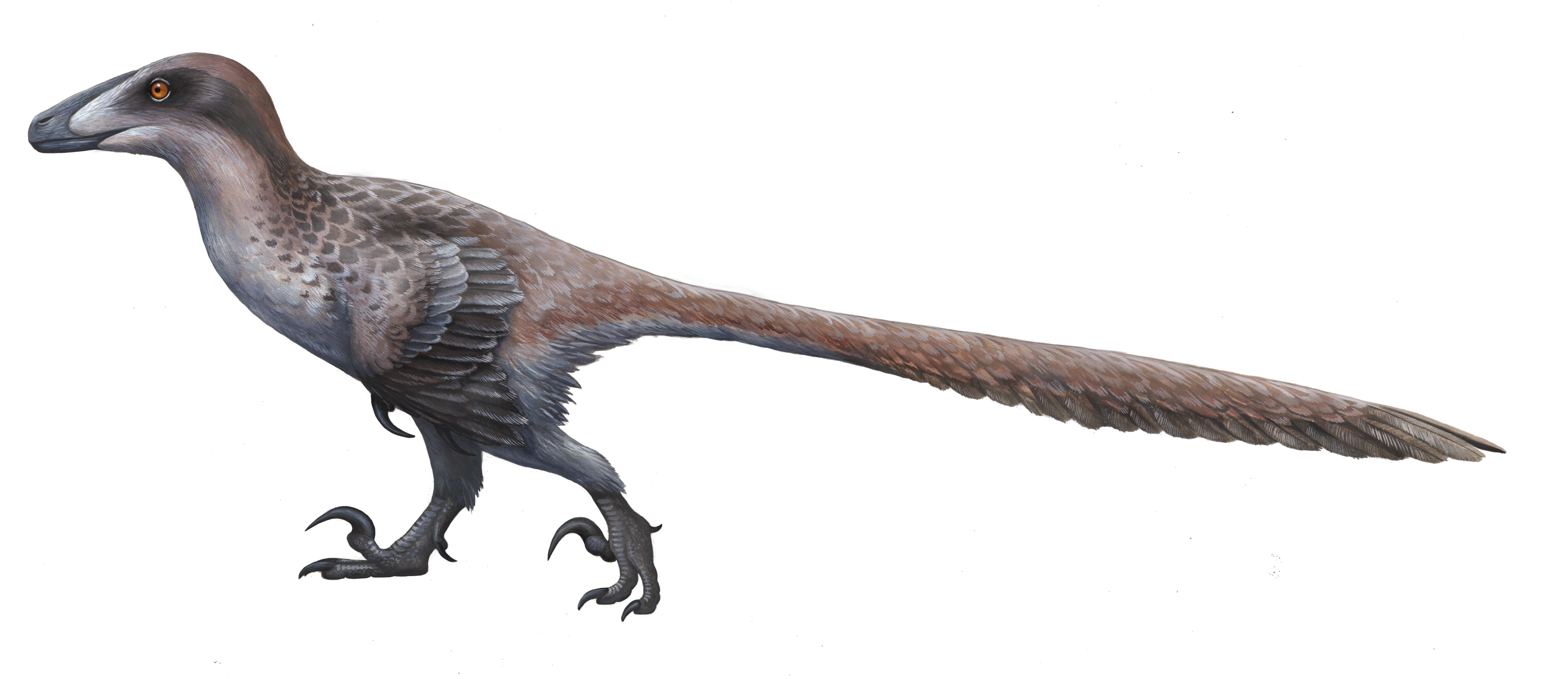
Artistic restoration of Deinonychus

==== 1969 ====
- John Ostrom described the new genus and species Deinonychus antirrhopus. This description provided the scientific literature with its first detailed information about the anatomy of the dromaeosaurid body, as previous work focused on the skull. He proposed that Deinonychus killed its prey with the enlarged, sharply curved claws on the second toe of its feet.
- Ostrom further described the anatomy of Deinonychus antirrhopus, providing further details about the anatomy of its body. Ostrom proposed that Deinonychus only walked on two of its toes.

=== 1970s ===
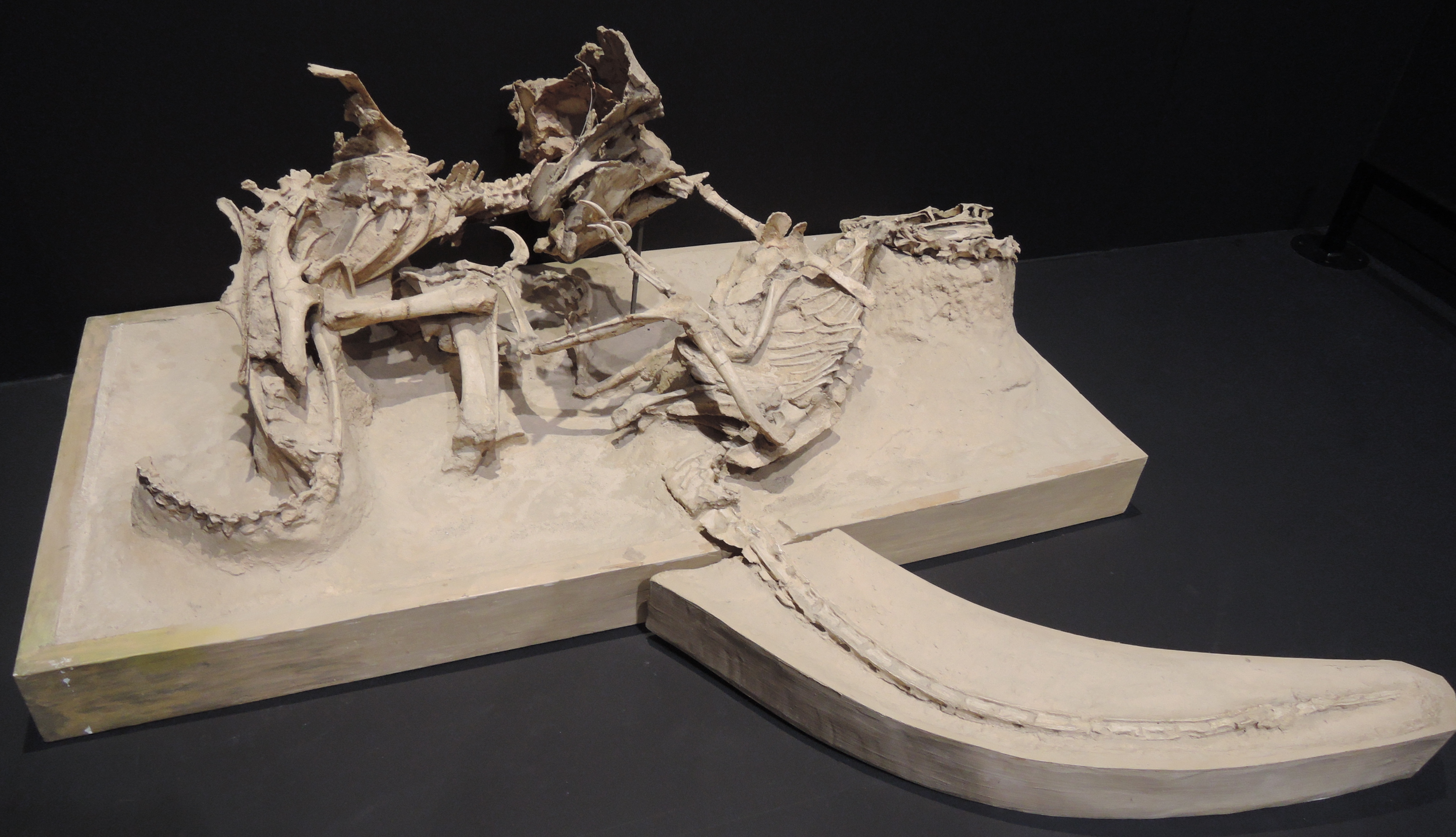
The "Fighting Dinosaurs" specimen of Velociraptor mongoliensis and Protoceratops andrewsi

==== 1972 ====
- Zofia Kielan-Jaworowska and Rinchen Barsbold reported the associated remains of a Velociraptor and Protoceratops apparently killed and preserved while fighting.

==== 1973 ====
- Dong Zhiming described the new genus and species Phaedrolosaurus ilikensis, based on an isolated tooth.
- Ostrom first discussed the apparent close evolutionary relationship between Deinonychus antirrhopus and birds.

==== 1975 ====
- Ostrom published further arguments building a case for a close evolutionary relationship between dromaeosaurids and birds.

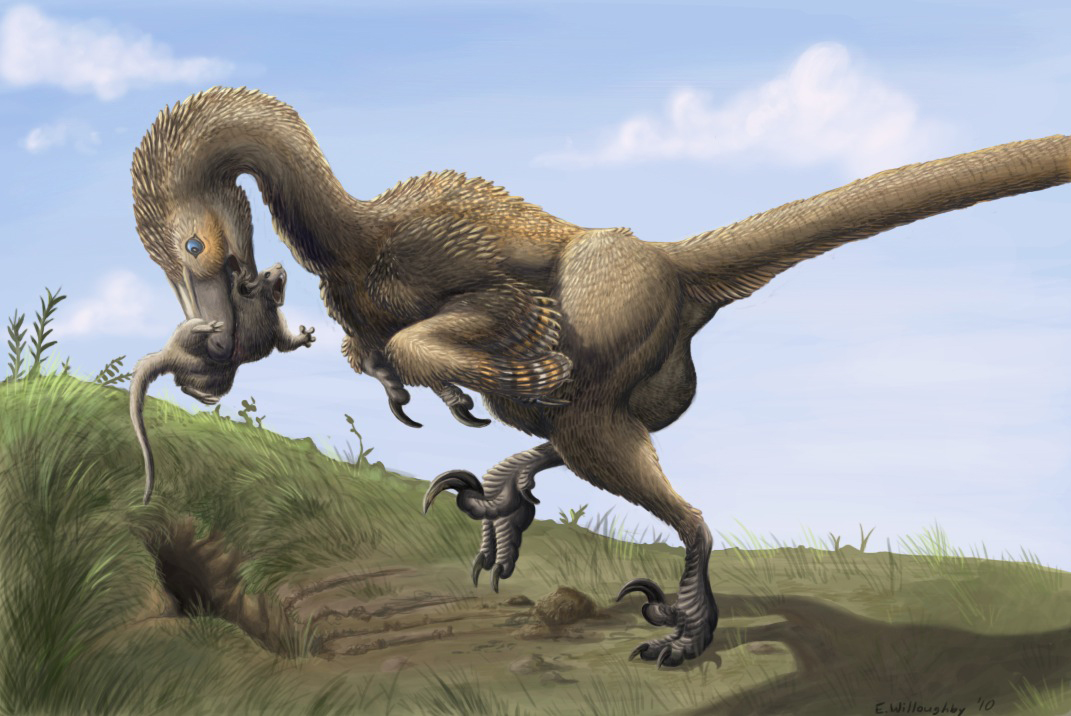
Artist's restoration of Saurornitholestes feeding on a mammal

==== 1976 ====
- Ostrom published further arguments building a case for a close evolutionary relationship between dromaeosaurids and birds.

==== 1978 ====
- Sues described the new genus and species Saurornitholestes langstoni.

==== 1979 ====
- Powell described the new genus and species Unquillosaurus ceibalii.

=== 1980s ===
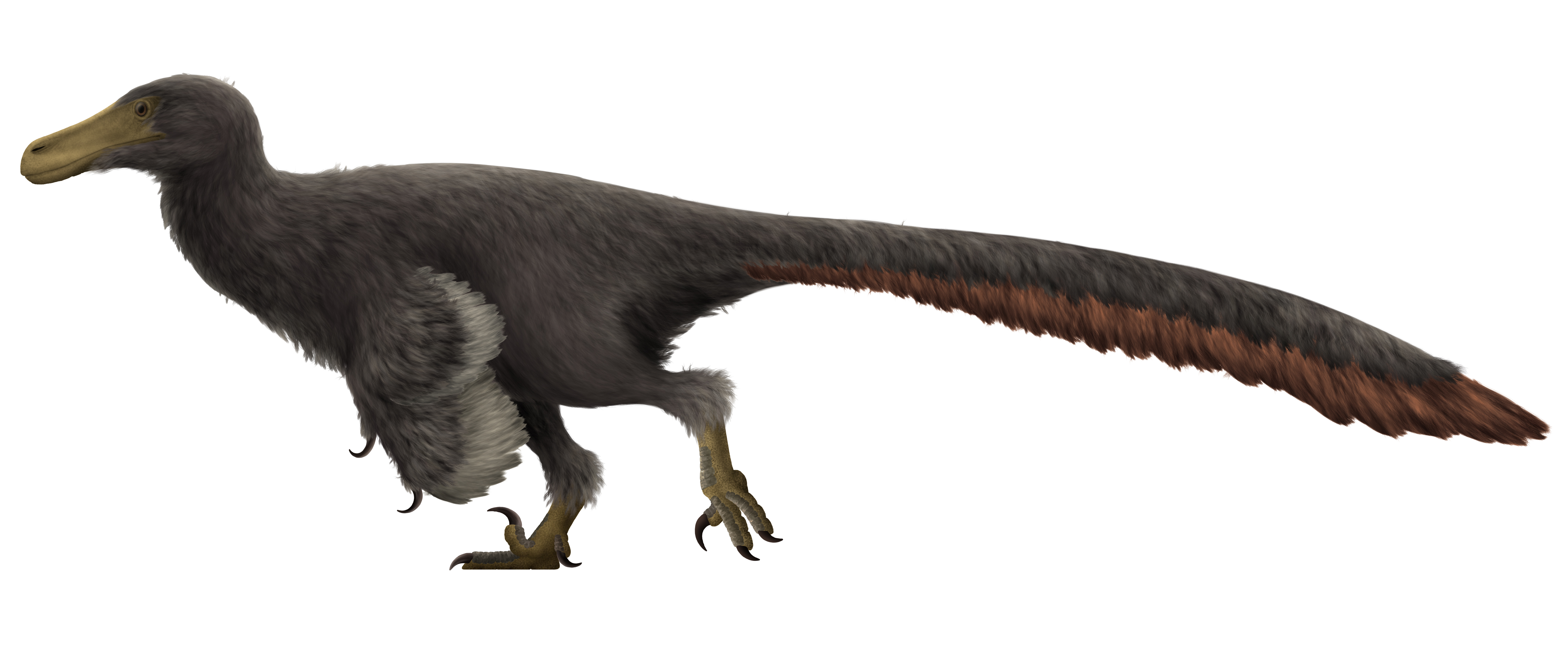
Artistic restoration of Adasaurus mongoliensis

==== 1981 ====
- Jensen described the new genus and species Palaeopteryx thomsoni.

==== 1982 ====
- Osmolska described the new genus and species Hulsanpes perlei.

==== 1983 ====
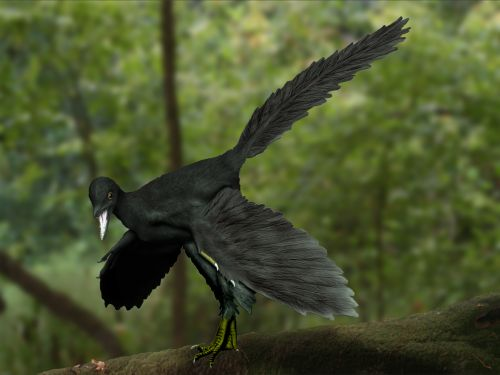
Archaeopteryx

- Rinchen Barsbold divided the Dromaeosauridae into two subfamilies; the Dromaeosaurinae and Velociraptorinae.
- Barsbold described the new genus and species Adasaurus mongoliensis. Unlike most dromaeosaurs, famous for the "killing claws" on their second toe, the second toe claw of A. mongoliensis was relatively small and not sharply curved. It is similar to those of troodontids.

==== 1985 ====
- Ostrom published further arguments building a case for a close evolutionary relationship between dromaeosaurids and birds.

==== 1986 ====
- Gauthier found strong support for Ostrom's hypothesis that dromaeosaurids were closely related to birds in "a pioneering and thorough analysis".

=== 1990s ===
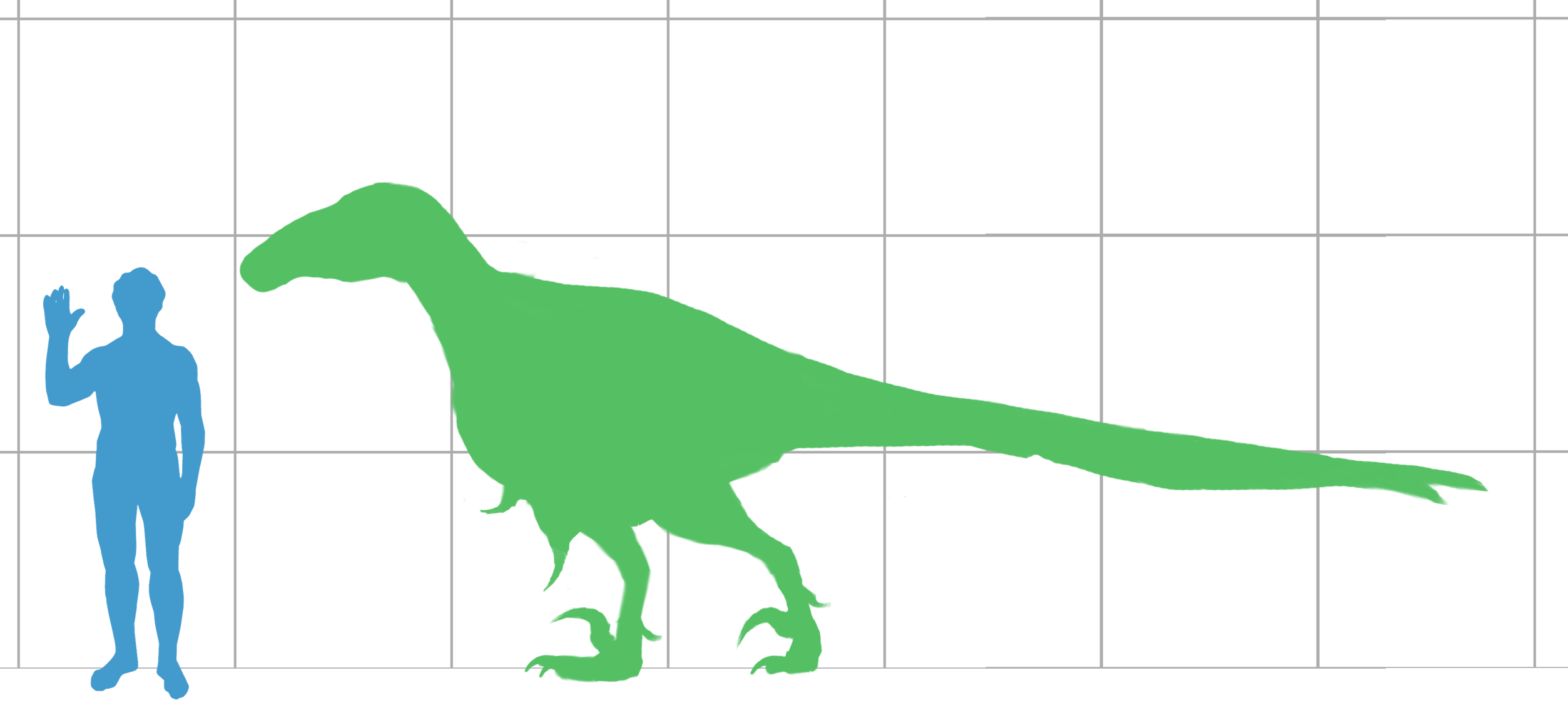
Illustration of a Utahraptor with a human to scale

==== 1990 ====
- Ostrom published further arguments building a case for a close evolutionary relationship between dromaeosaurids and birds.

==== 1993 ====
- James I. Kirkland, Donald Burge, and Robert Gaston described the new genus and species Utahraptor ostrommaysi.
- Osmolska challenged Kielan-Jaworowska and Barsbold's 1972 interpretation of an associated skeleton of Velociraptor and Protoceratops as being of two animals killed and preserved while locked in mortal combat. She reinterpreted the association as a Velociraptor that had been killed while scavenging an already dead Protoceratops.

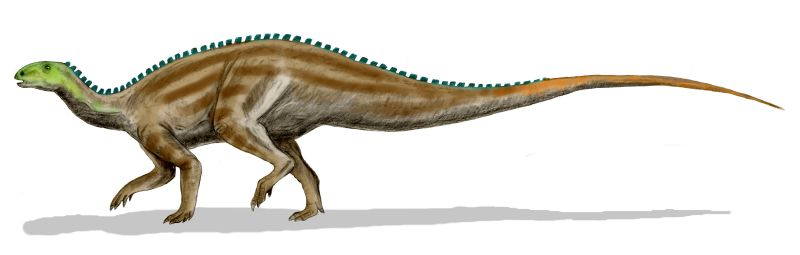
Tenontosaurus may have been the prey of Deinonychus

==== 1994 ====
- Ostrom speculated that Deinonychus hunted in packs to subdue prey larger than itself based on an association between several Deinonychus skeletons and a specimen of the ornithopod Tenontosaurus.

==== 1995 ====
- Currie followed Barsbold's division of Dromaeosauridae into Dromaeosaurinae and Velociraptorinae. However, he proposed differing definitions for these subfamilies and argued that they had different members than were included under Barsbold's classification scheme.
- Maxwell and Ostrom reported on the association of Deinonychus teeth and Tenontosaurus remains and argued that these provided further support for the hypothesis that Deinonychus was a pack hunter.
- Unwin and others followed the fighting-to-the-death interpretation of the fighting dinosaurs specimen.

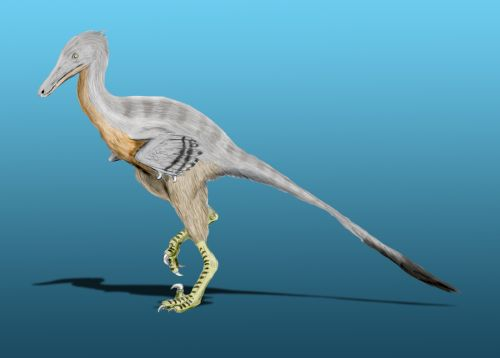
Artist's restoration of Unenlagia

==== 1997 ====
- Novas and Puerta described the new genus and species Unenlagia comahuensis.
- Chatterjee argued that dromaeosaurids lived in trees based on the anatomy of their hands and the backward orientation of the pubic bones in their pelvis.
- Reid examined histological sections of the bones of Saurornitholestes to see whether or not they were consistent with the idea that dromaeosaurids were warm blooded. However, the results of his study were inconclusive.
- Ruben and others attempted to reconstruct the way air would flow through the snouts of dromaeosaurids during respiration to see whether or not it was consistent with the airflow patterns of modern cold or warm-blooded animals. They found that the probable course of airflow through the snout of a living, breathing dromaeosaurid would have been more consistent with that of a cold blooded animal. However, the anatomical reconstructions the researchers used to draw these conclusions have been criticized for positioning the choana too far forward and for excluding the animals' secondary palate.

==== 1998 ====
- Le Leouff and Buffetaut described the new genus and species Variraptor mechinorum.

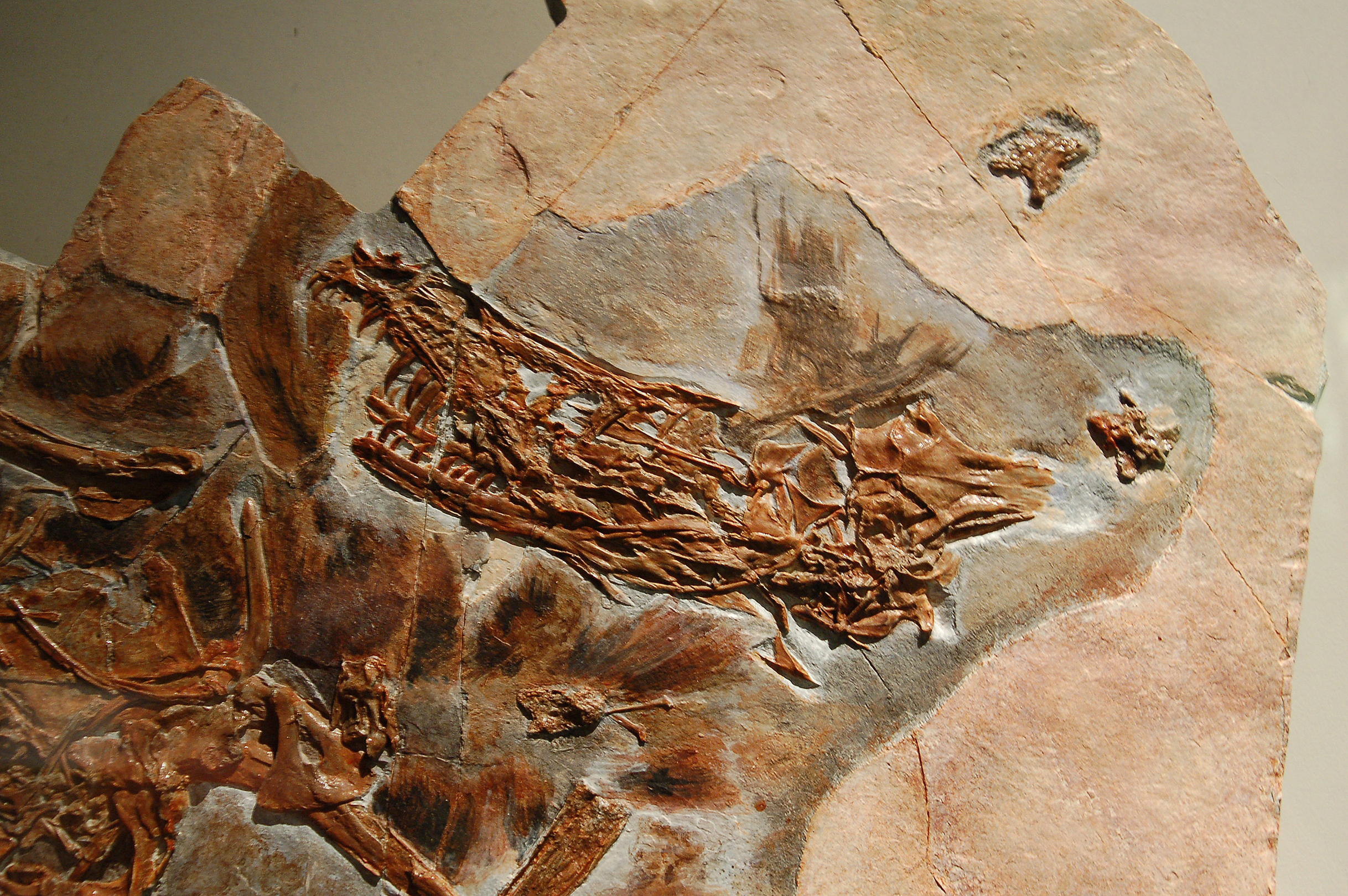
Feathered type specimen of Sinornithosaurus

- D. L. Brinkman and others reinterpreted the association between several Deinonychus specimens and a Tenontosaurus as preserving the aftermath of an ancient feeding frenzy rather than as evidence of pack hunting behavior in Deinonychus as argued by Ostrom.

==== 1999 ====
- Clark and others argued that it was impossible to know whether or not Velociraptor was a predator of Protoceratops based on the famous "fighting dinosaurs" specimen, since this was only one specimen.
- Altangerel Perle, Norell and Clark described the new genus and species Achillobator giganticus.
- Xu, Wang, and Wu described the new genus and species Sinornithosaurus millenii. The specimen actually preserved the remains of the feathers that covered the animal in life. The presence of a feathery covering is consistent with the idea that dromaeosaurids were warm-blooded. They also performed a cladistic analysis of the Dromaeosauridae, finding more support for dividing the family into Dromaeosaurinae and Velociraptorinae. The researchers found both groups to be monophyletic clades, with Sinornithosaurus milenii the sister group to both, and therefore the most primitive known dromaeosaurid.

== 21st century ==
=== 2000s ===
==== 2000 ====
- Burnham and others described the new genus and species Bambiraptor feinbergorum.
- Xu, Zhou and Wang described the new genus and species Microraptor zhaoianus.
- Allain and Taquet described the new genus and species Pyroraptor olympius.

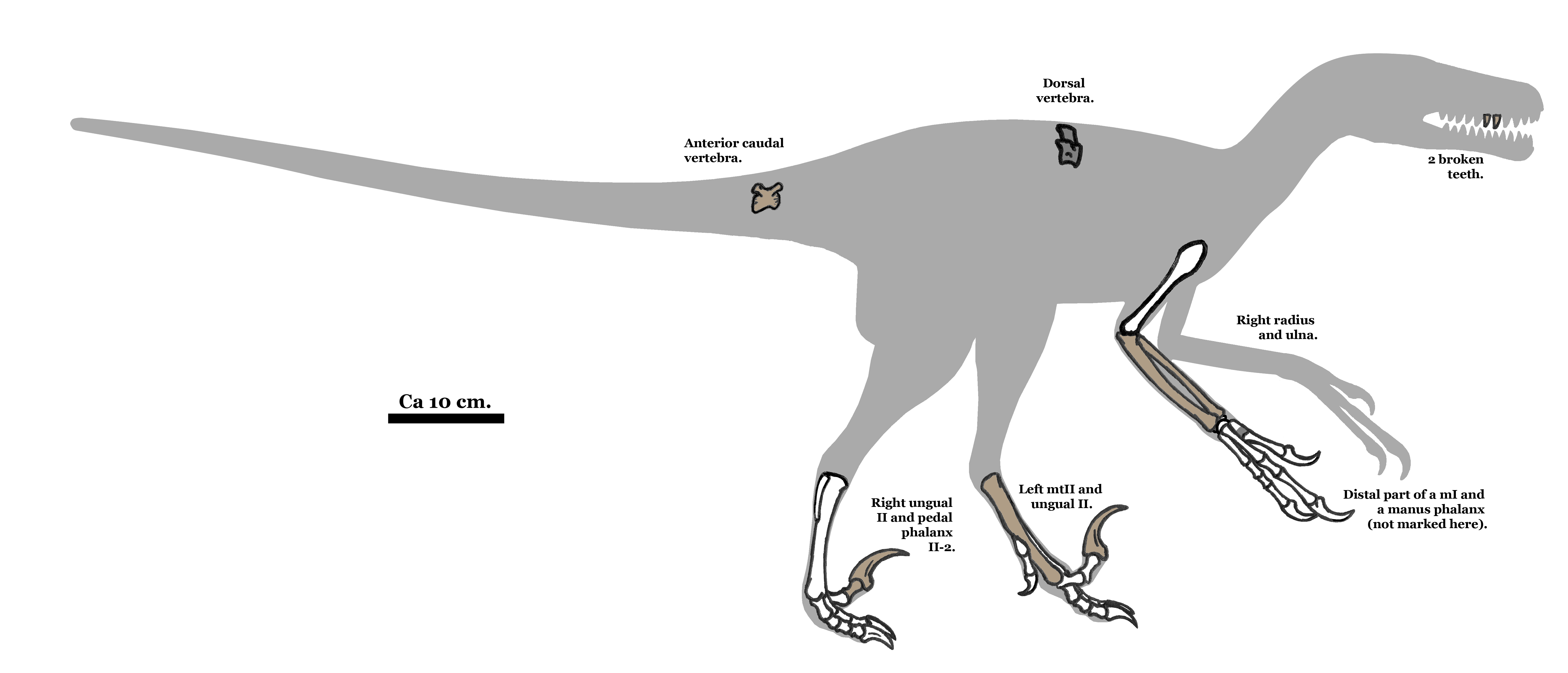
Known skeletal remains of Pyroraptor

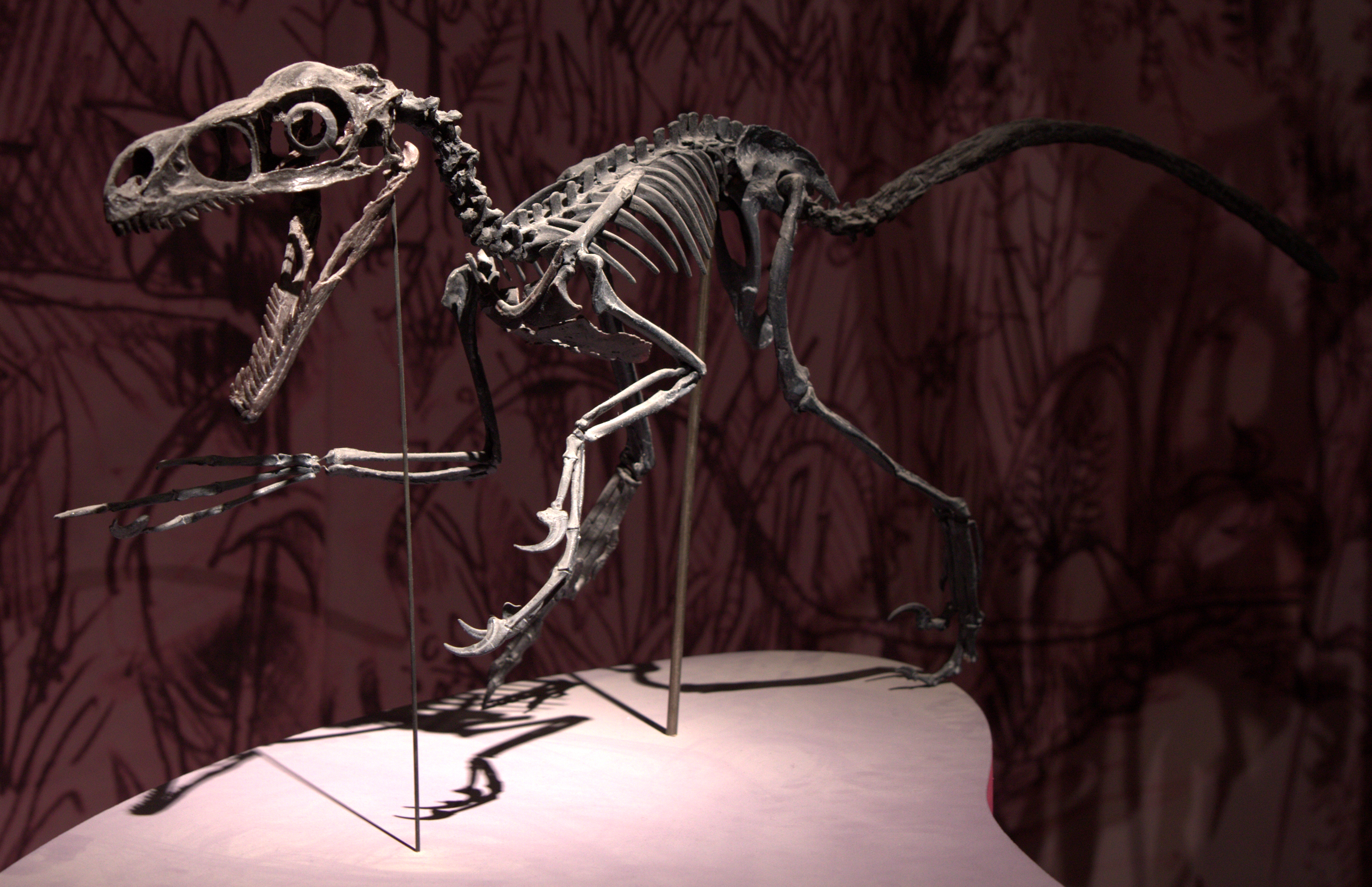
Skeletal reconstruction of Bambiraptor

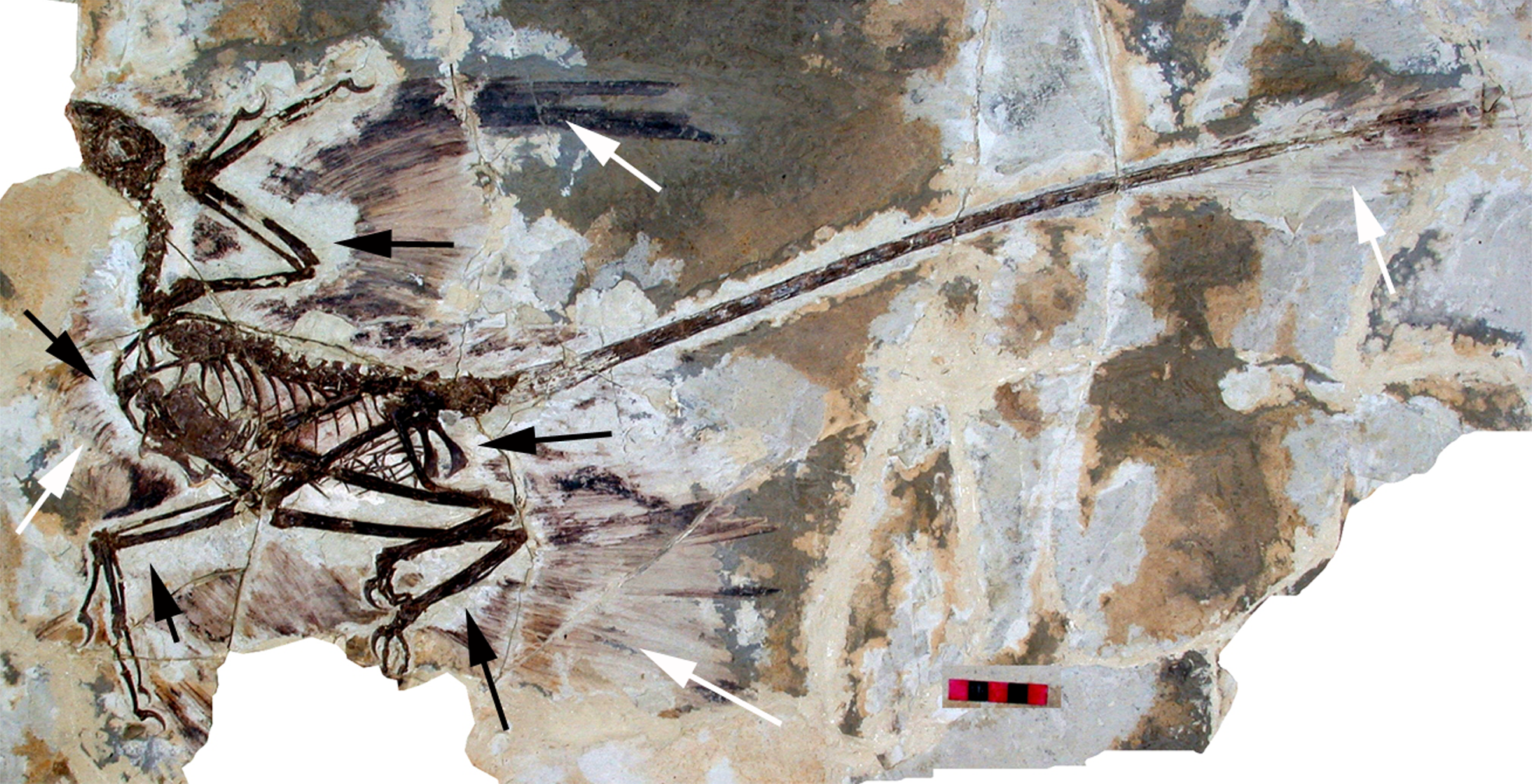
Fossil of Microraptor

==== 2001 ====
- A. R. Jacobsen published a description of a dentary referred to Saurornitholestes with tooth marks. The specimen was preserved in the Dinosaur Park Formation. Although a specific identification cannot be made, the shape of the preserved serration marks implicate a juvenile individual of one of the formation's tyrannosaurids, like Gorgosaurus, Daspletosaurus, or Aublysodon. All of the marks on the jawbone seem to have been left by the same animal because the serration marks all share the same morphology.
- Kevin Padian, Ji Qiang and Ji Shu-an published a review of known feathered dinosaurs and their implications for the origin of flight. The authors observed that many aspects of the distribution of feather homologues in the dinosaur family tree met the expectations of earlier phylogenetic hypotheses, including a gradual transition from primitive filaments in Sinosauropteryx to the shared filaments and "rudimentary" true feathers in Caudipteryx and Protarchaeopteryx, to flight feathers in Archaeopteryx. However, they also noted, only filamentous protofeathers had been observed in dromaeosaurs like Sinornithosaurus, when Caudipteryx-style true feathers would be expected due to the family's phylogenetic position. Also noted were the lack of known integumentary structures among troodontids. The authors proposed that either science's understanding of coelurosaur evolution is faulty or feathers evolved multiple times.

Cladogram of feathered dinosaurs from Padian et al. 2001

Feathered Dinosaurs

- Coelurosaurs
  - - - Maniraptora
        - - Aves
            - - - - - - Neornithes (P)
                      - Ichthyornis
                    - Hesperornis
                  - Patagopteryx
                - Enantiornithes (P)
              - Confuciusornis (P)
            - Archaeopteryx (P)
          - - Dromaeosaurs (F)
            - Troodontids
        - - - - Oviraptor
              - Caudipteryx (F)
            - Therizinosaurs (F)
          - Protarchaeopteryx (F)
      - Ornithomimids
    - Tyrannosaurus
  - - Sinosauropteryx (F)
    - Compsognathus

Taxa marked with a P were known to bear plumulaceous or pennaceous feathers at the time of the study. Taxa marked with F were known to bear simple filamentous integumentary structures.

==== 2002 ====
- Hwang and others performed a cladistic analysis of the Dromaeosauridae.
- Xu and others performed a cladistic analysis of the Dromaeosauridae.

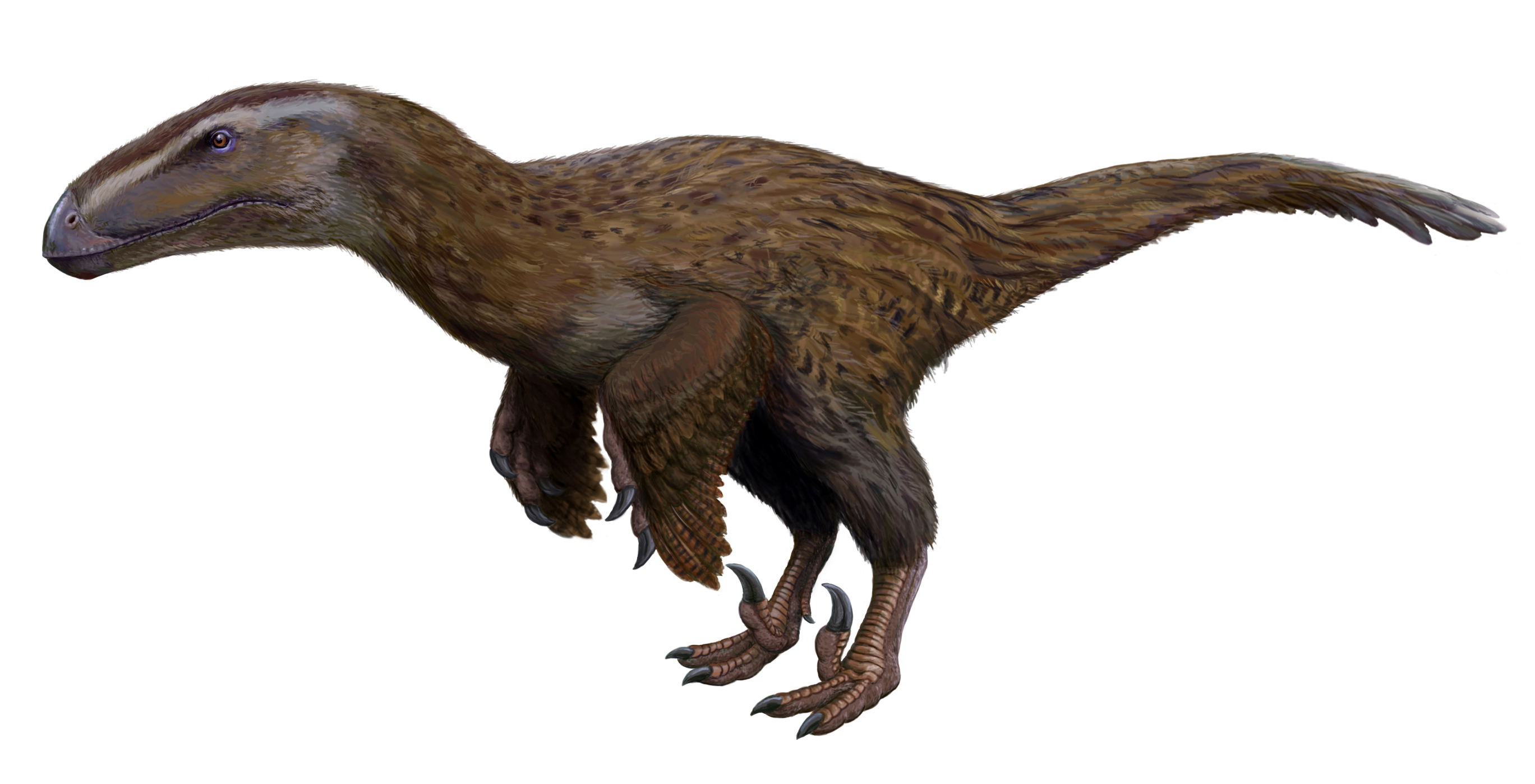
Artist's restoration of Dromaeosauroides

- Czerkas and others described the new genus and species Cryptovolans pauli.

==== 2003 ====
- Christiansen and Bonde described the new genus and species Dromaeosauroides bornholmensis.

==== 2004 ====
- Currie and Varricchio described the new genus and species Atrociraptor marshalli.

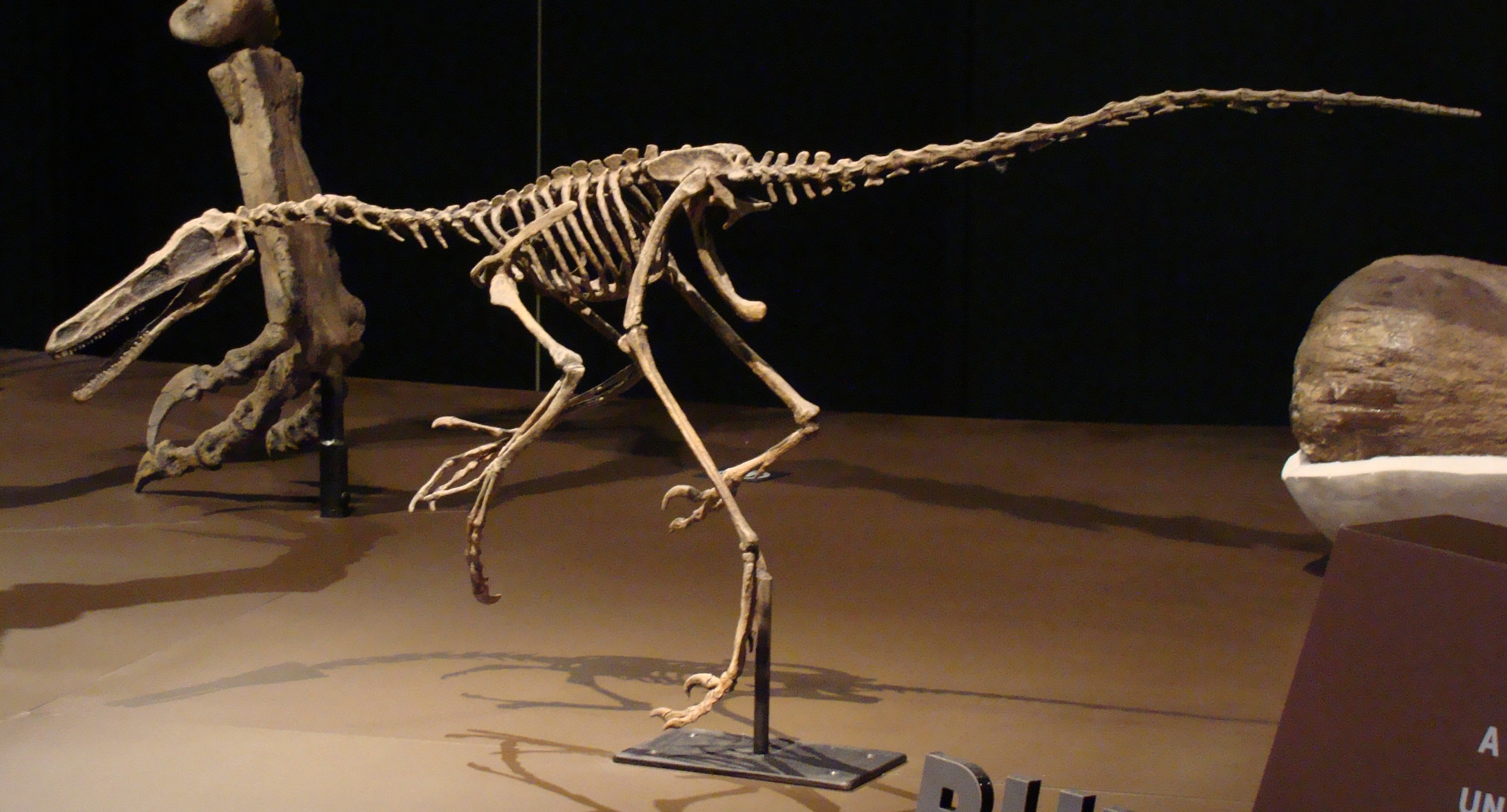
Skeletal mount of Buitreraptor

- Xu and Wang described the new genus and species Graciliraptor lujiatunensis.

==== 2005 ====
- Rauhut and Xu declare Phaedrolosaurus a nomen dubium, based on the limited material attributed to the name and the lack of autapomorphies in the isolated tooth.
- Makovicky, Apesteguía and Agnolin described the new genus and species Buitreraptor gonzalezorum.
- Novas and Pol described the new genus and species Neuquenraptor argentinus.

==== 2006 ====
- Norell and others described the new genus and species Tsaagan mangas.

==== 2007 ====
- Lü and others described the new genus and species Luanchuanraptor henanensis.

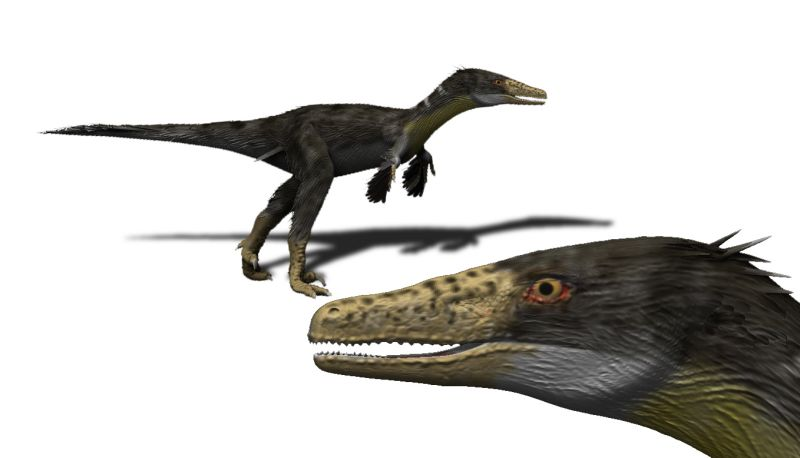
Artist's restoration of Austroraptor

- Turner and others described the new genus and species Mahakala omnogovae.
- A. S. Turner, S. H. Hwang, and M. A. Norell described the new genus and species Shanag ashile.

==== 2008 ====
- Novas et al. described the new genus and species Austroraptor cabazai.

==== 2009 ====
- Longrich and Currie described the new genus and species Hesperonychus elizabethae.

=== 2010s ===
==== 2010 ====
- Xu and others described the new genus and species Linheraptor exquisitus.
- Zheng and others described the new genus and species Tianyuraptor ostromi.

==== 2011 ====
- Porfiri, Calvo and Santos described the new genus and species Pamparaptor micros.

==== 2012 ====
- Gong and others described the new species Microraptor hanqingi.

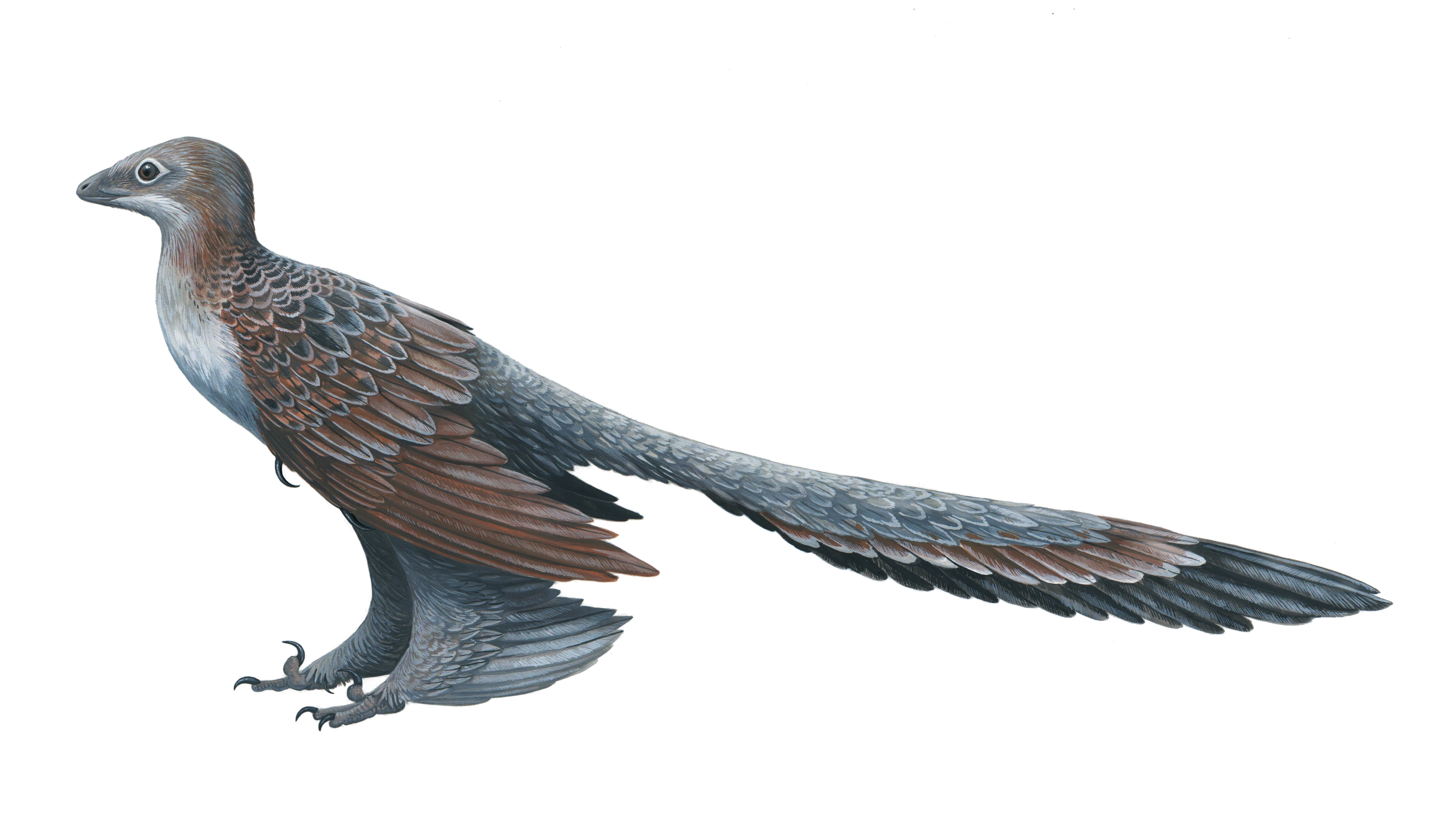
Artist's restoration of Changyuraptor

- Senter and others described the new genus and species Yurgovuchia doellingi.

==== 2013 ====
- D. C. Evans, D. W. Larson, and P. J. Currie described the new genus and species Acheroraptor temertyorum.

==== 2014 ====
- Han and others described the new genus and species Changyuraptor yangi.

==== 2015 ====
- Jasinski described the new species Saurornitholestes sullivani.
- Lü and Brusatte described the new genus and species Zhenyuanlong suni.
- DePalma et al. described the new genus and species Dakotaraptor steini.

Cladogram of dromaeosaurids from Lü and Brusatte 2015

- Dromaeosauridae
  - Mahakala
  - - Unenlagia
    - Austroraptor
    - Buitreraptor
    - Rahonavis
    - - Graciliraptor
      - Changyuraptor
      - Microraptor
      - Sinornithosaurus
      - Tianyuraptor
      - Zhenyuanlong
      - - Eudromaeosauria
          - Bambiraptor
          - Saurornitholestes
          - Tsaagan
          - Adasaurus
          - Deinonychus
          - - Balaur
            - Velociraptor
            - Dromaeosaurinae
              - Achillobator
              - Utahraptor
              - Atrociraptor
              - Dromaeosaurus

- Bell and Currie described the new genus and species Boreonykus certekorum.

==== 2017 ====
- Xu and others described the new genus and species Zhongjianosaurus yangi.
- Cau and others described the new genus and species Halszkaraptor escuilliei.

==== 2019 ====
- An ungual phalanx of a dromaeosaurid theropod is described from the Blagoveshchensk area (Russia) by Bolotskii, Bolotskii & Sorokin (2019).

== See also ==
- History of paleontology
- Timeline of paleontology
