= David A. Burnham =

American paleontologist

- Born: Troy, New York
- Education: University of New Orleans (B.S., M.S.); University of Kansas (Ph.D.)
- Scientific career
- Fields: Paleontology, Geology
- Workplaces: University of Kansas

David A. Burnham is an American paleontologist whose research has focused on theropod dinosaurs, primitive birds and the origin of avian flight. He served as state paleontologist and vertebrate paleontology preparator at the University of Kansas Biodiversity Institute and Natural History Museum. His research has included work on Bambiraptor feinbergi, Microraptor, Tyrannosaurus rex, and the Tanis fossil site at the Cretaceous–Paleogene boundary.

== Early life and education ==
Burnham spent his early life in Montana and Wyoming but was primarily raised in New Orleans, Louisiana. He received a B.S. in geology from the University of New Orleans in 1987 and an M.S. in geology from the university in 1991. He received a Ph.D. in geology from the University of Kansas in 2007. His degree research focused on vertebrate paleontology.

== Career ==
Burnham was curator of fossil reptiles at the Black Hills Institute of Geological Research from 1991 to 1994. He joined the University of Kansas (KU) in 1998 as state paleontologist and later served as vertebrate paleontology preparator at the KU Biodiversity Institute and Natural History Museum. He also served as an adjunct curator at the Florida Institute of Paleontology from 1999 to 2005.

Burnham retired from KU in April 2025. During his career at KU, he participated in more than 50 paleontological expeditions, including fieldwork in the Hell Creek Formation.

== Research ==
Burnham's early research at KU involved a nearly complete juvenile dromaeosaur specimen that was discovered in Montana. The fossil was subsequently described as Bambiraptor feinbergi, with Burnham as lead author of its 2000 description.

Burnham studied the origin of bird flight, including the aerodynamics of Microraptor. In 2010, he and colleagues published experimental tests of different gliding configurations using physical models of Microraptor. His research on Microraptor was featured in the PBS NOVA documentary The Four-Winged Dinosaur. Burnham also conducted fossil research in China related to feathered theropods and primitive birds such as Sapeornis. Burnham also produced a short documentary about the discovery and excavation of juvenile Triceratops. The film was an official selection of the Underground Film Festival in 2025.

In 2006, Burnham began leading KU excavations of a subadult Tyrannosaurus rex specimen in the Hell Creek Formation of Montana. In 2016, his team discovered a separate juvenile tyrannosaur specimen in the formation, which Burnham continued excavating through 2024. The team studied the juvenile specimen's growth, anatomy and possible differences in feeding ecology between juvenile and adult tyrannosaurs. Burnham's Montana fieldwork was featured by CBS Sunday Morning.

In 2013, Burnham coauthored a study of a Tyrannosaurus rex tooth embedded in healed hadrosaur vertebrae. The healing showed that the hadrosaur survived the bite and provided direct evidence that T. rex attacked living prey.

Burnham coauthored a 2018 study reconstructing the skull of the Cretaceous bird Ichthyornis dispar. The same year, he coauthored research on a brachiosaurid foot from Wyoming that was reported as the largest known sauropod foot at the time.

In 2019, Burnham coauthored research on the Tanis fossil site in North Dakota. The site preserves a fossil assemblage associated with the aftermath of the Chicxulub impact at the Cretaceous–Paleogene boundary.
