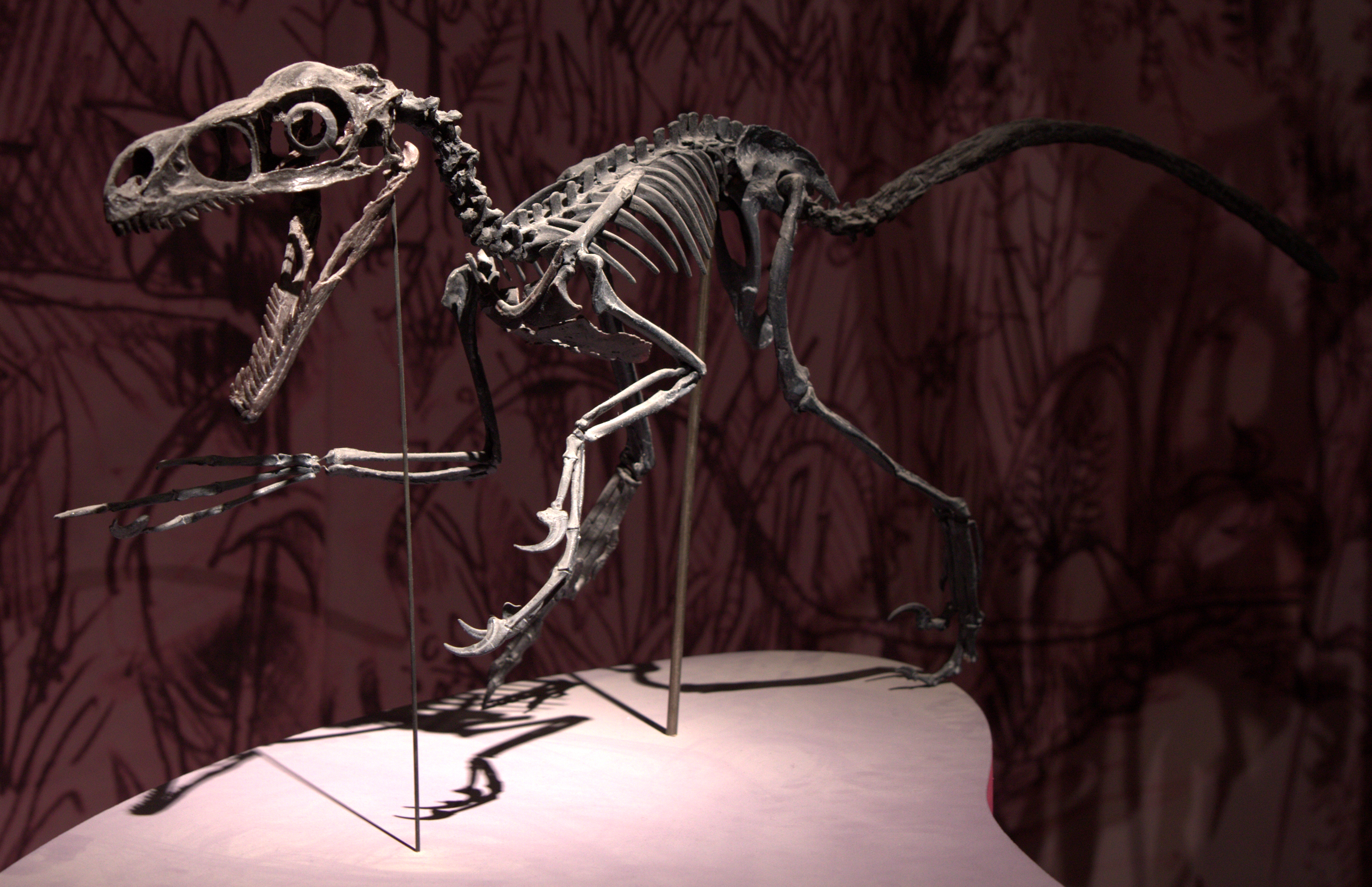
- Restored skeleton of the juvenile specimen

Scientific classification
- Kingdom: Animalia
- Phylum: Chordata
- Class: Reptilia
- Clade: Dinosauria
- Clade: Saurischia
- Clade: Theropoda
- Family: †Dromaeosauridae
- Clade: †Eudromaeosauria
- Subfamily: †Saurornitholestinae
- Genus: †Bambiraptor; Burnham et al., 2000

Type species
- †Bambiraptor feinbergi Burnham et al., 2000

= Bambiraptor =

Bambiraptor Temporal range: Late Cretaceous, 72 Ma

Extinct genus of dinosaurs

Bambiraptor is a genus of bird-like dromaeosaurid theropod dinosaur that lived during the Late Cretaceous (about 72 million years ago) of Montana. It was described by scientists at the University of Kansas, Yale University, and the University of New Orleans. The holotype fossil is less than 1 m (3.3 ft) long, although this specimen appears to be a juvenile, and it is possible that Bambiraptor is a juvenile Saurornitholestes. It is even suspected that the type specimen is a chimera, based on the fact that "there are elements of three different similarly sized lower legs included in the holotype." Because of its small size, it was named Bambiraptor feinbergi, after the popular Disney movie character (the name literally translates to "Bambi thief") and the surname of the wealthy family who bought and lent the specimen to the new Graves Museum of Natural History in Florida.

== Discovery ==
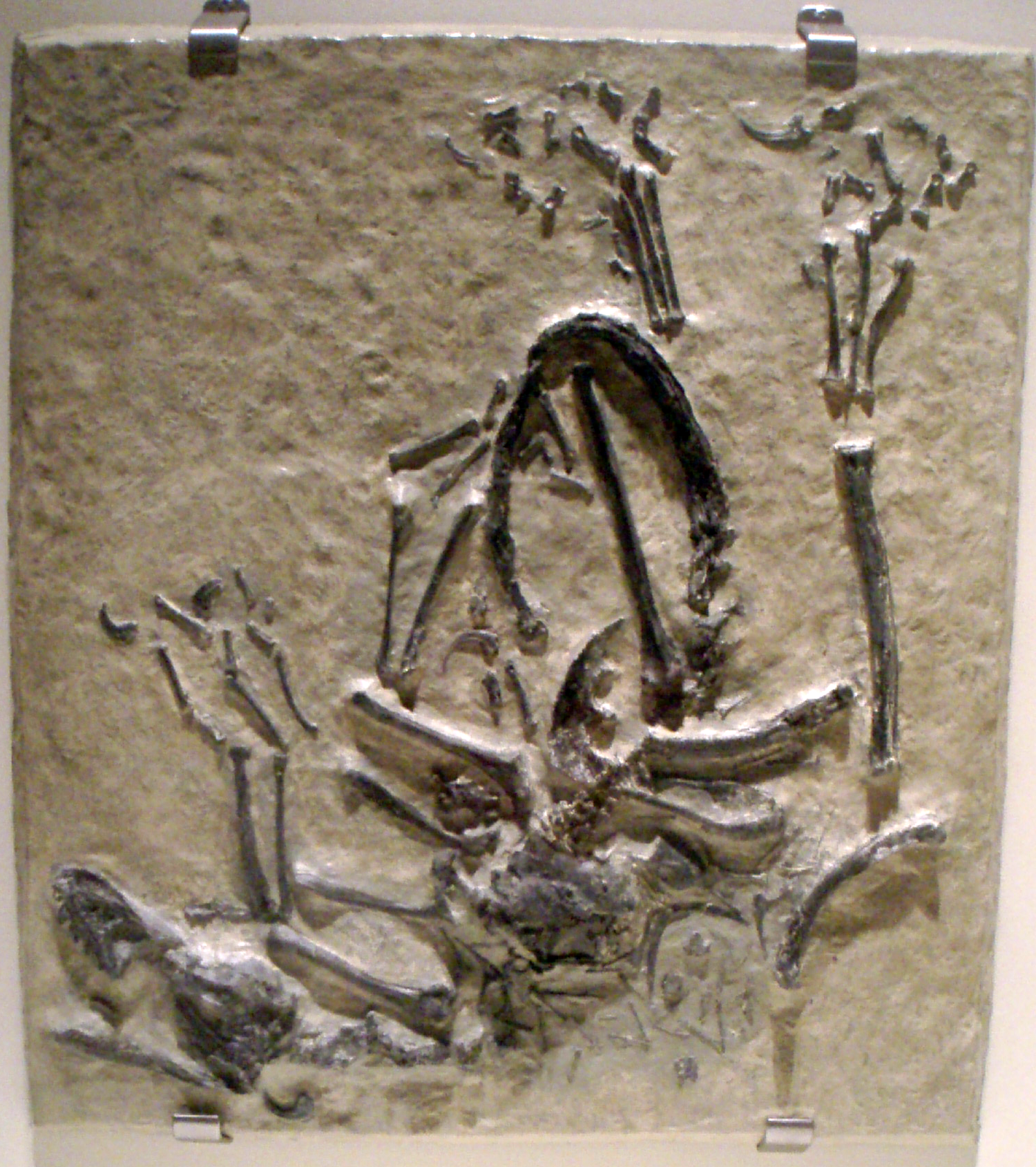
Cast of the fossil slab

The Bambiraptor skeleton was discovered in 1995 by 14-year-old fossil hunter Wes Linster, who was looking for dinosaur bones with his parents near Glacier National Park in Montana, United States. Linster told Time magazine that he uncovered the skeleton on a tall hill and was amazed at his discovery. "I bolted down the hill to get my mom because I knew I shouldn't be messing with it", he said. The bones that Linster discovered on that hilltop led to the excavation of a skeleton that was approximately 95 percent complete. Because of its completeness Florida Paleontology Institute Director Martin Shugar compared it to the Rosetta Stone that enabled archaeologists to translate Egyptian hieroglyphics. Yale paleontologist John Ostrom, who reintroduced the theory of bird evolution from dinosaurs after his 1964 discovery of Deinonychus in Wyoming, agreed, calling the specimen a "jewel", and telling reporters that the completeness and undistorted qualities of the bones should help scientists further understand the dinosaur-bird link.

The fossil first was seen as the young of Saurornitholestes and in 1997 reported as belonging to a Velociraptor sp. In 2000 it was named and described by David Burnham, Kraig Derstler, Phil Currie, Robert Bakker, Zhou Zhonge and John Ostrom as a new genus: Bambiraptor feinbergi. The generic name is derived from Bambi, in reference to the young age of the specimen, and a Latin raptor, "seizer". The specific epithet honours Michael and Ann Feinberg who acquired the specimen from a fossil poacher and made it available to science. In 2000 George Olshevsky suggested the emended epithet "feinbergorum", the plural genitive, and this was followed by some authors but such emendations are no longer allowed by the ICZN.

The holotype specimen AMNH FR 30556 (previously AMNH 001 and FIP 001, sometimes wrongly referred to as AMNH FR 30554), was uncovered in layers of the Upper Two Medicine Formation dating to the late Campanian. It is currently housed at the American Museum of Natural History, New York. It consists of a partially articulated largely complete skeleton with skull of a juvenile individual. Though the right side of the skeleton is damaged, most bones are uncompressed and well-preserved. The end of the tail is lacking. Also a paratype was assigned in 2000, FIP 002-136, consisting of thirty-four skeletal elements of at least two adult individuals found near the holotype. In 2004 an upper jaw bone was referred to the species, specimen MOR 553S-7-30-91-274.

== Description ==
While adult specimens are known, only the type specimen, a juvenile, has been described. This juvenile Bambiraptor has a preserved length of 90 centimetres (3.0 ft), and an estimated total length of one metre. It perhaps weighed only two kilograms (4.4 lb). It had long hindlimbs, indicating it could have been a fast runner. It also had very long arms and a well-developed wishbone. According to an SVP abstract published in 2021, the holotype is 30-40% the size of specimen MOR 553S-7-30-91-274. Directly scaling up the holotype specimen gives a length of 2.5-3.3 m. However, this is likely a low estimate since the specimen is a maxilla with proportions like that of the holotype, and juvenile animals tend to have proportionally longer skulls. In 2010 Gregory S. Paul estimated the adult length at 1.3 metres (4.3 ft), the weight at five kilogrammes.

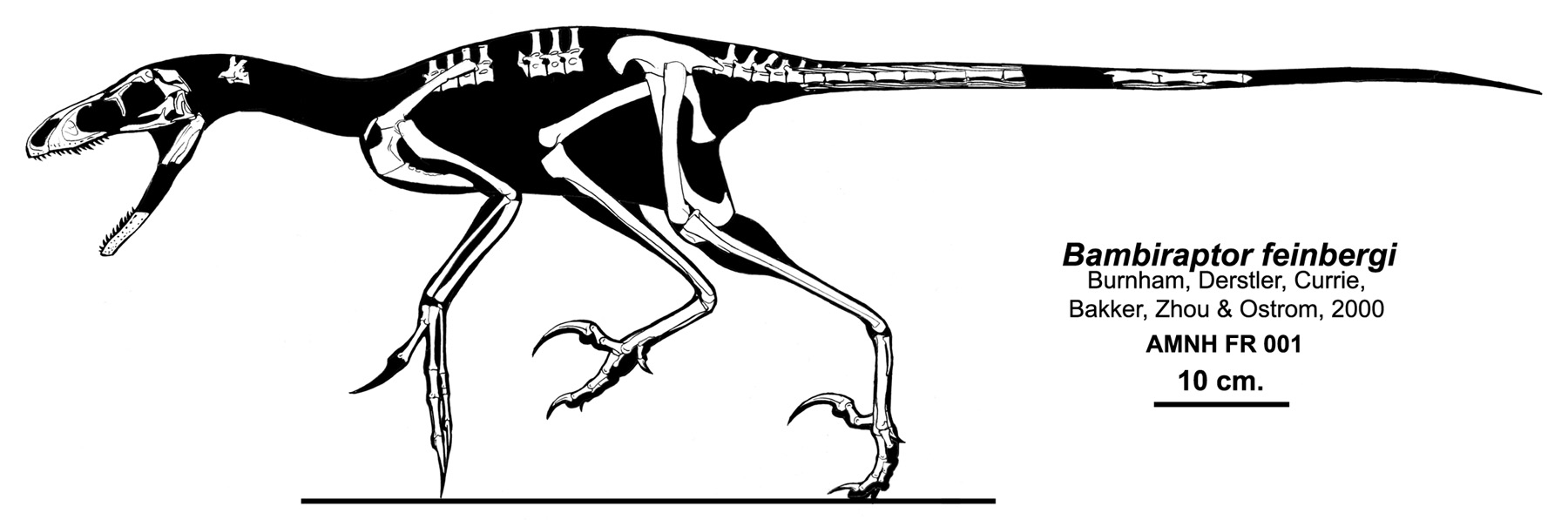
Skeletal restoration

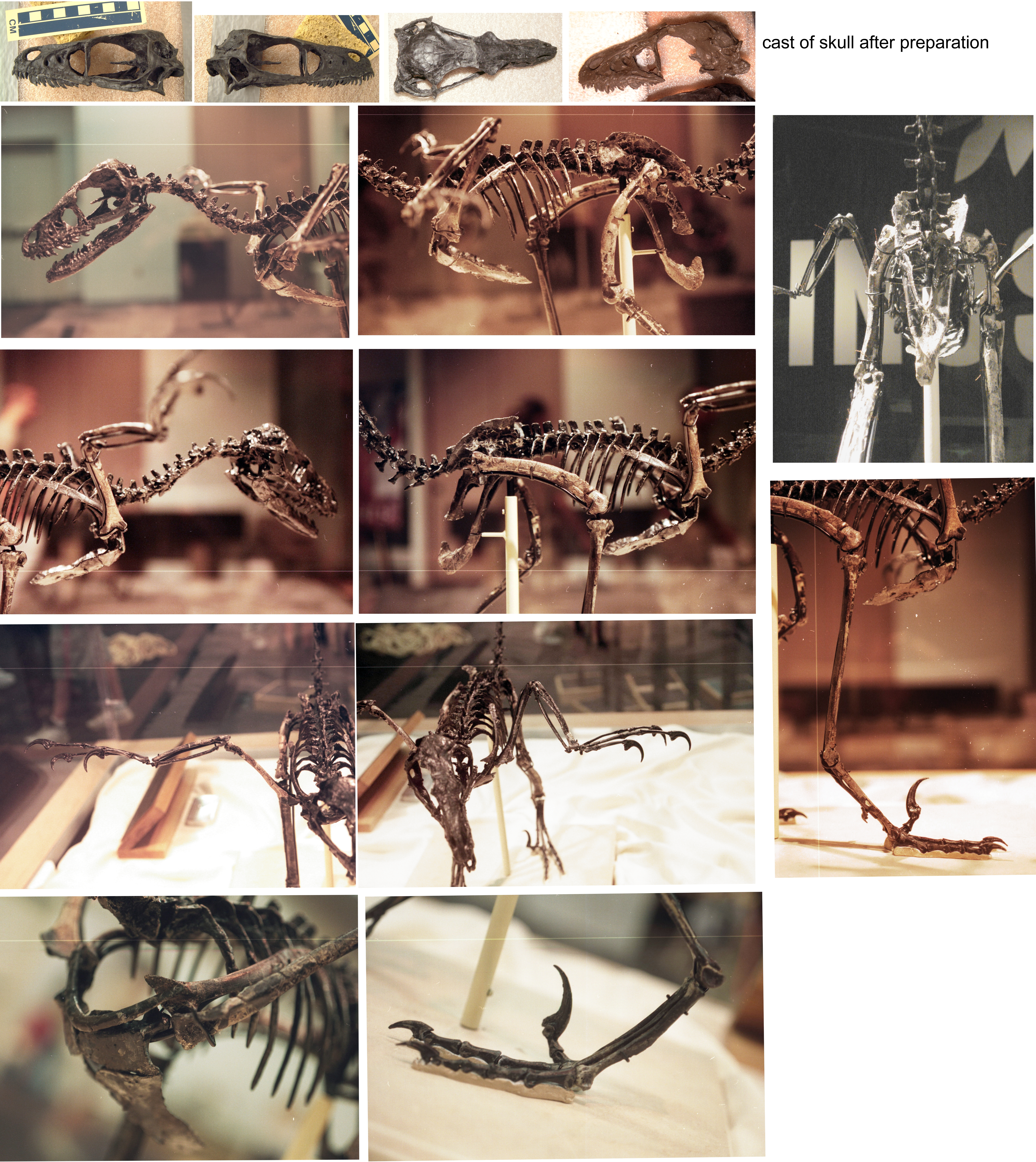
Detail views of Bambiraptor.

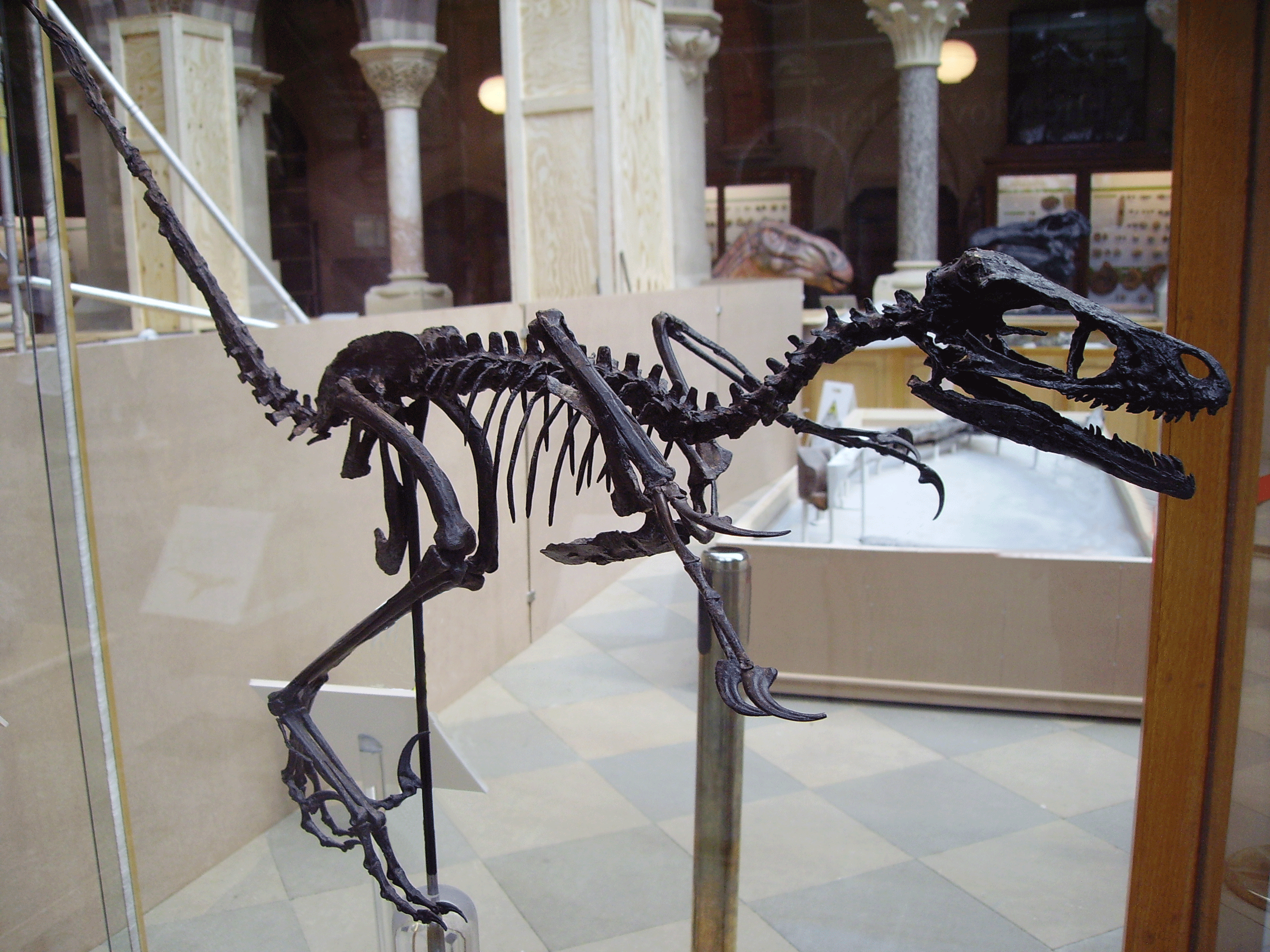
Restored skeleton in Oxford University Museum

=== Forelimbs ===
Research done by Phil Senter of the Lamar State College in Orange, Texas has indicated that Bambiraptor may have had mutually opposable first and third fingers and a forelimb maneuverability that would allow the hand to reach its mouth. This would have given the animal the ability to "hold" food in its front limbs and place it in its mouth, in a similar manner to some modern-day small mammals.

=== Brain ===
Bambiraptor had a brain size in the lower range of modern birds. Because of its enlarged cerebellum, which may indicate higher agility and higher intelligence than other dromaeosaurs, David A. Burnham has hypothesized that Bambiraptor feinbergi may have been arboreal. Life in the trees may have required evolutionary pressure that resulted in a larger brain. Burnham also offers an alternative hypothesis that a larger brain could be selected for as a result of hunting more agile prey items such as lizards and mammals. The Bambiraptor holotype had with 14 cm^{3} the largest brain for its size of any dinosaur yet discovered, although the brain size may be due to its age, because juvenile animals tend to have larger brain-to-body ratios compared to adults.

=== Feathers ===
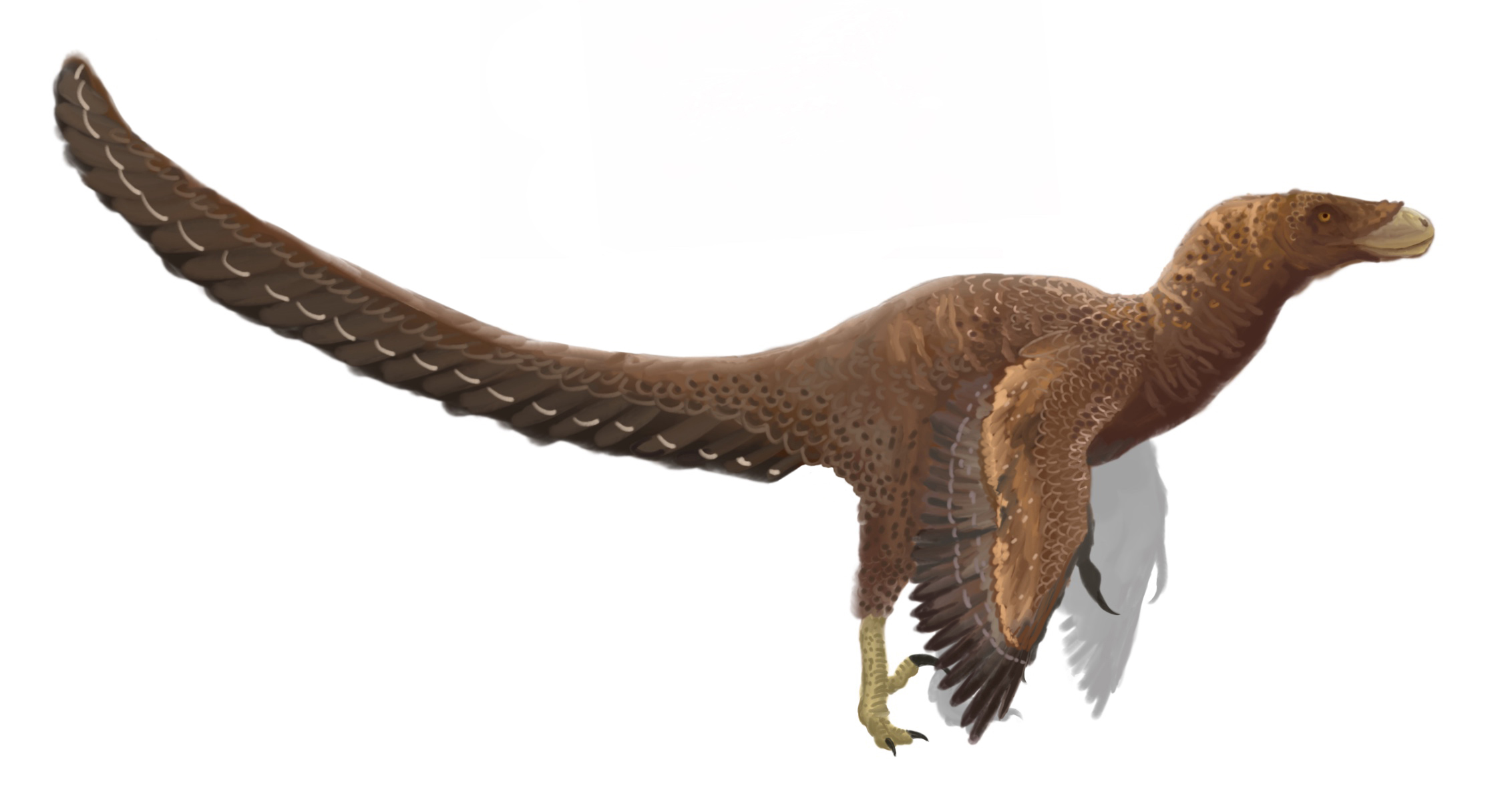
Artist's restoration of the juvenile specimen

During the conference where Bambiraptor was first introduced, the dinosaur reconstruction specialist Brian Cooley portrayed Bambiraptor as having feathers, despite the fact that no feathers were found with the fossil itself. His decision was influenced by the fact that because Bambiraptor within a cladistic analysis was a member of a group, Paraves, that contained feathered true birds and that was the sister taxon of Oviraptorosauria, a group that also had feathered forms (e.g. Caudipteryx), Bambiraptor most likely had feathers too due to phylogenetic bracketing. Most paleontologists support Cooley's view, and subsequent discoveries confirmed that small dromaeosaurid dinosaurs like Bambiraptor were fully covered in feathers (see Dromaeosauridae for more information).

== Phylogeny ==
Bambiraptor was assigned to the Dromaeosauridae in 2000, though its position within the family remains uncertain, since subsequent cladistic analyses show different results. It has been recovered as a microraptorian or a saurornitholestine, and the most recent phylogenetic analyses place it as a sister taxon or a member of Eudromaeosauria.

== See also ==
- Timeline of dromaeosaurid research
