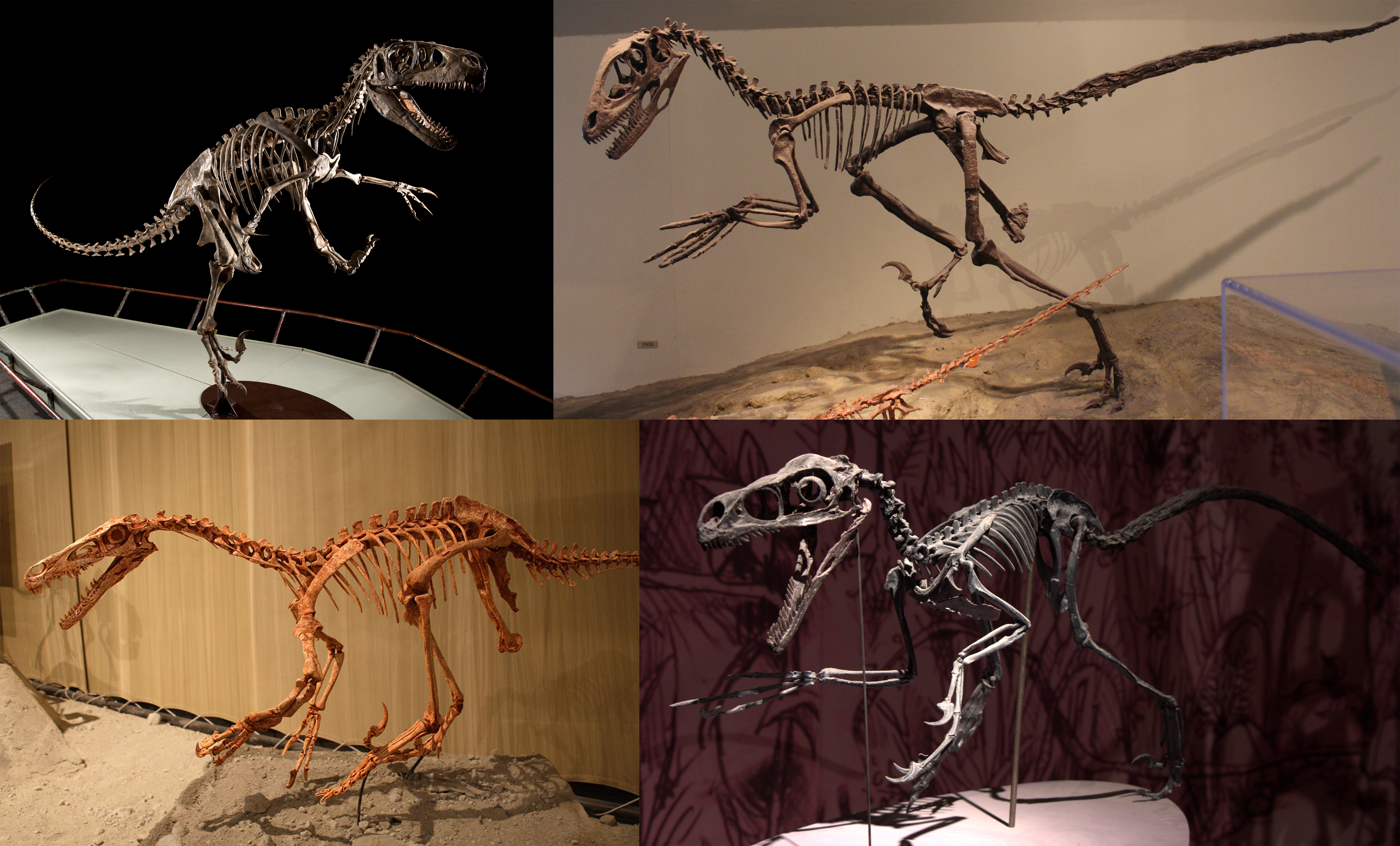
- Eudromaeosauria diversity, featuring from top left to lower right: Utahraptor, Deinonychus, Velociraptor and Bambiraptor

Scientific classification
- Kingdom: Animalia
- Phylum: Chordata
- Class: Reptilia
- Clade: Dinosauria
- Clade: Saurischia
- Clade: Theropoda
- Family: †Dromaeosauridae
- Clade: †Eudromaeosauria; Longrich & Currie, 2009

Type species
- †Dromaeosaurus albertensis Matthew & Brown, 1922

Subgroups
- †Boreonykus?
- †Deinonychus
- †Dineobellator
- †Dromaeosaurinae Matthew & Brown, 1922
  - †Achillobator?
  - †Dromaeosaurus
  - †Itemirus?
  - †Utahraptor?
  - †Yurgovuchia?
- †Saurornitholestinae Longrich & Currie, 2009
  - †Acheroraptor?
  - †Atrociraptor
  - †Bambiraptor?
  - †Saurornitholestes
- †Velociraptorinae Barsbold, 1983
  - †Adasaurus?
  - †Kansaignathus
  - †Kuru
  - †Linheraptor
  - †Luanchuanraptor
  - †Shri
  - †Tsaagan
  - †Velociraptor
Potentially included genera
- †Balaur
- †Dakotaraptor
- †Dromaeosauroides
- †Hesperonychus
- †Nuthetes
- †Ornithodesmus
- †Phaedrolosaurus
- †Pyroraptor
- †Tianyuraptor
- †Variraptor
- †Vectiraptor
- †Yixianosaurus
- †Zapsalis

= Eudromaeosauria =

Eudromaeosaurs Temporal range: Early Cretaceous – Late Cretaceous, 139–66 Ma Possible Kimmeridgian record

Extinct clade of dinosaurs

Eudromaeosauria (/ˌjuːdrəʊˈmeɪːəʊˈsɔːri͡ə/; "true dromaeosaurs") is a subgroup of terrestrial dromaeosaurid theropod dinosaurs. They were small to large-sized predators that flourished during the Cretaceous Period. Eudromaeosaur fossils are known almost exclusively from the northern hemisphere.

Eudromaeosaurs first appeared in the early Cretaceous Period and survived until the end of the Cretaceous (Maastrichtian stage, 66 Ma). The earliest known definitive eudromaeosaur is the probable dromaeosaurine Yurgovuchia, from the Cedar Mountain Formation, dated to 139 million years ago. However, the earlier (143-million-year-old) fossils such as those of Nuthetes and several indeterminate teeth dating to the Kimmeridgian stage may represent eudromaeosaurs.

While other dromaeosaurids filled a variety of specialized ecological niches, mainly those of small predators or specialized piscivores, eudromaeosaurs functioned as hypercarnivores and are suggested to have been predators of medium- to large-sized prey. Aside from their generally larger size, eudromaeosaurs are also characterized by several features of the foot.

== History of study ==
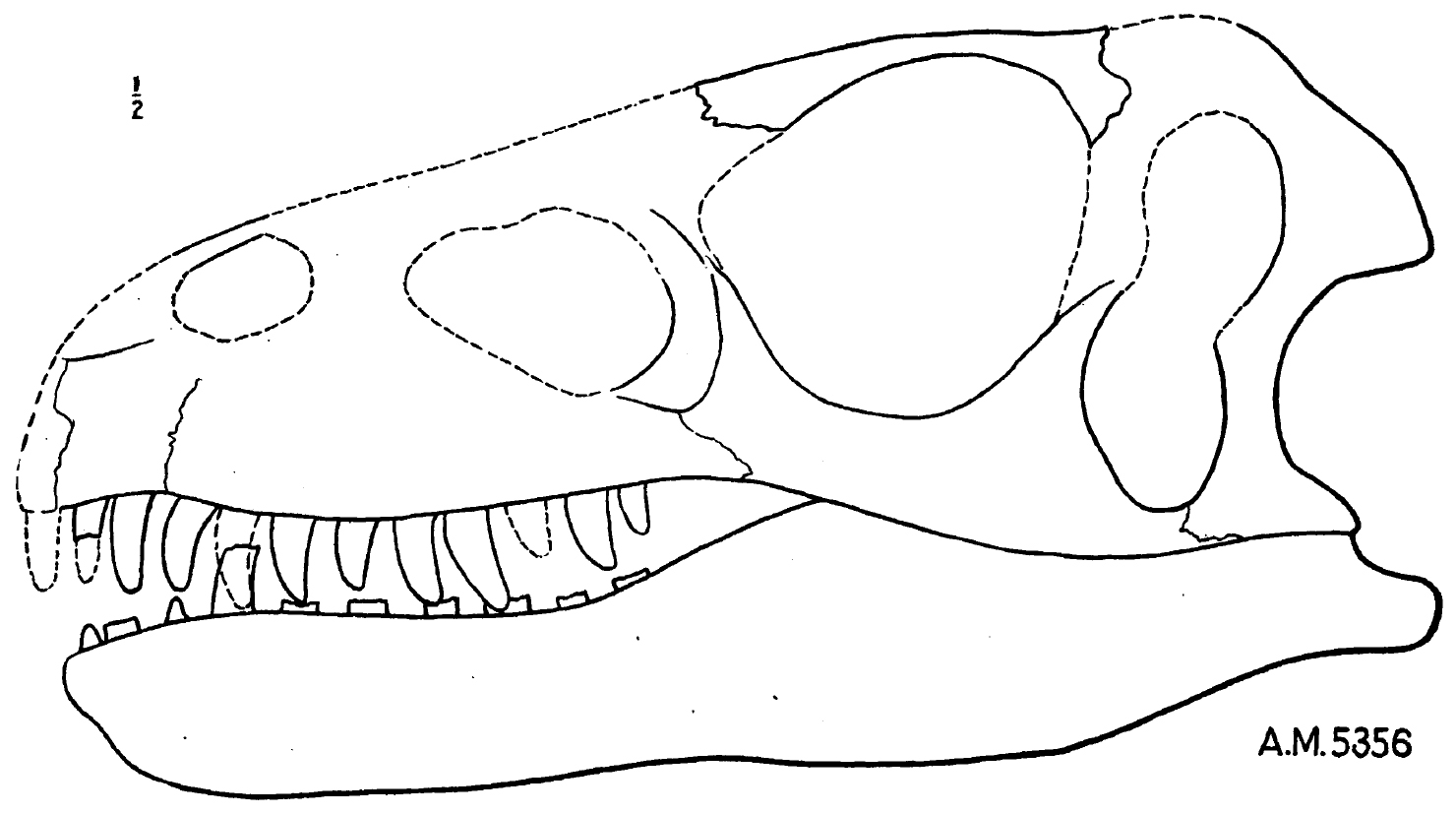
An illustration of the holotype of Dromaeosaurus from 1922

The subfamily Dromaeosaurinae was first erected in 1922 by William Matthew and Barnum Brown as a part of the "Deinodontidae" (now named Tyrannosauridae). Today, Dromaeosaurinae has been formally defined as a monophyletic group including Dromaeosaurus and all the other dromaeosaurs closer to it than to Velociraptor, Microraptor, Passer and Unenlagia. This group was also moved to be within its own family, Dromaeosauridae, which was named when it became apparent that Dromaeosaurus was not closely related to tyrannosaurids.

Eudromaeosauria itself was first defined as a node-based clade by Nick Longrich and Philip J. Currie in 2009, as the most inclusive natural group containing Dromaeosaurus, Velociraptor, Deinonychus, and Saurornitholestes, their most recent common ancestor and all of its other descendants. The various "subfamilies" have also been redefined as clades, usually defined as all species closer to either Velociraptor, Dromaeosaurus, or Saurornitholestes than to either of the other two.

This group is further subdivided into three subfamilies: Dromaeosaurinae, Velociraptorinae, and Saurornitholestinae. Dromaeosaurines are usually found to consist of medium- to giant-sized species, with generally box-shaped skulls while the other subfamilies generally have narrower snouts. Velociraptorinae has traditionally included the more slender-snouted species which are found primarily in Asia, although this group may also include North American genera like Dineobellator and Deinonychus. Saurornitholestinae, the most recently named subfamily, typically consists of smaller species with shortened snouts. A number of eudromaeosaurs have not been assigned to any particular subfamily, because they are too poorly preserved to be placed confidently in phylogenetic analysis.

Most eudromaeosaur genera are known from only 1-2 specimens. The major exceptions to this are Deinonychus, Utahraptor, Saurornitholestes, Velociraptor, and Dromaeosaurus, which are each known from multiple reasonably-complete specimens.

== Anatomy ==
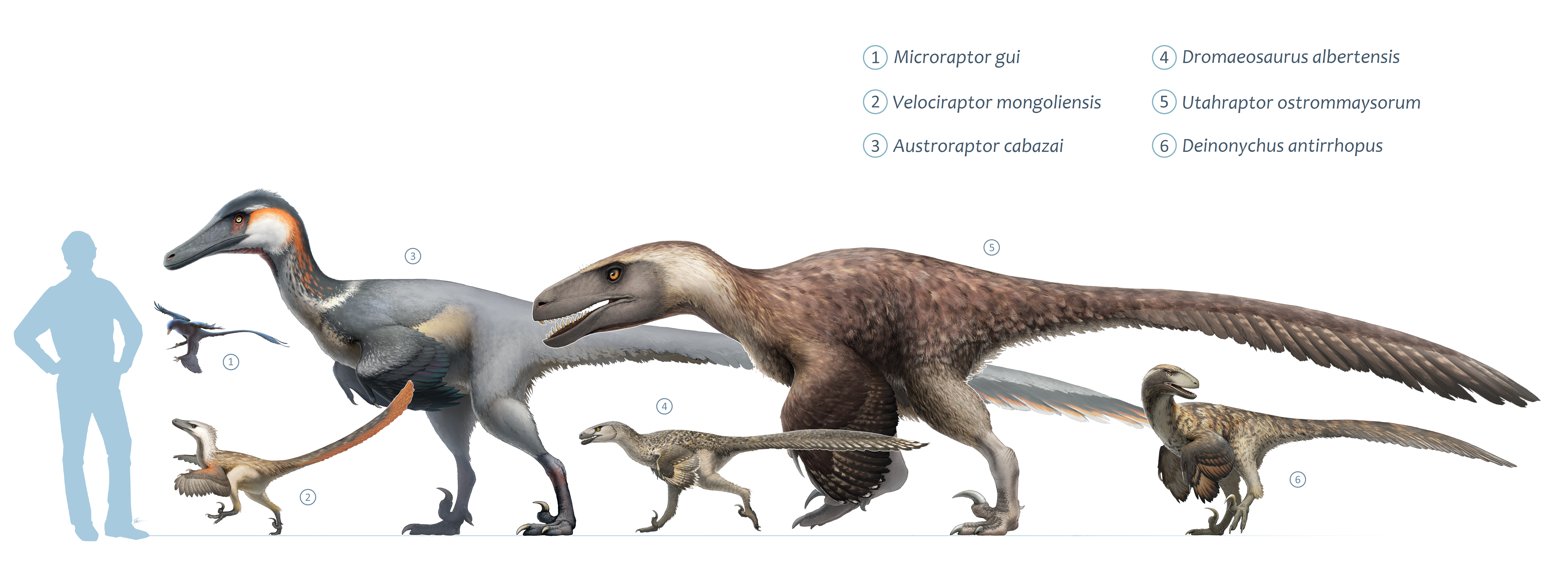
Reconstructions of several dromaeosaurids including four eudromaeosaurs

Eudromaeosaurs were all bipedal and had relatively long arms in comparison to other theropods, like most other maniraptorans. Their wrists exhibited the typical maniraptoran condition in the semi-lunate carpal, which allowed them to fold their arms against their body in the same way that modern birds fold their wings. However unlike many other groups of coelurosaurs, eudromaeosaurs possessed relatively short metatarsals.

Their second toe possessed the archetypal sickle-claw that all known dromaeosaurids bore which was held off the ground so that only the third and fourth toes touched the ground when walking. Eudromaeosaurs also generally possessed long and stiff tails, which are believed to have been used for balance. There is some direct evidence of eudromaeosaurs such as Velociraptor being feathered. Today, it is believed that all eudromaeosaurs were fully-feathered and possessed wings, along with most, if not all, other maniraptorans.

=== Size ===
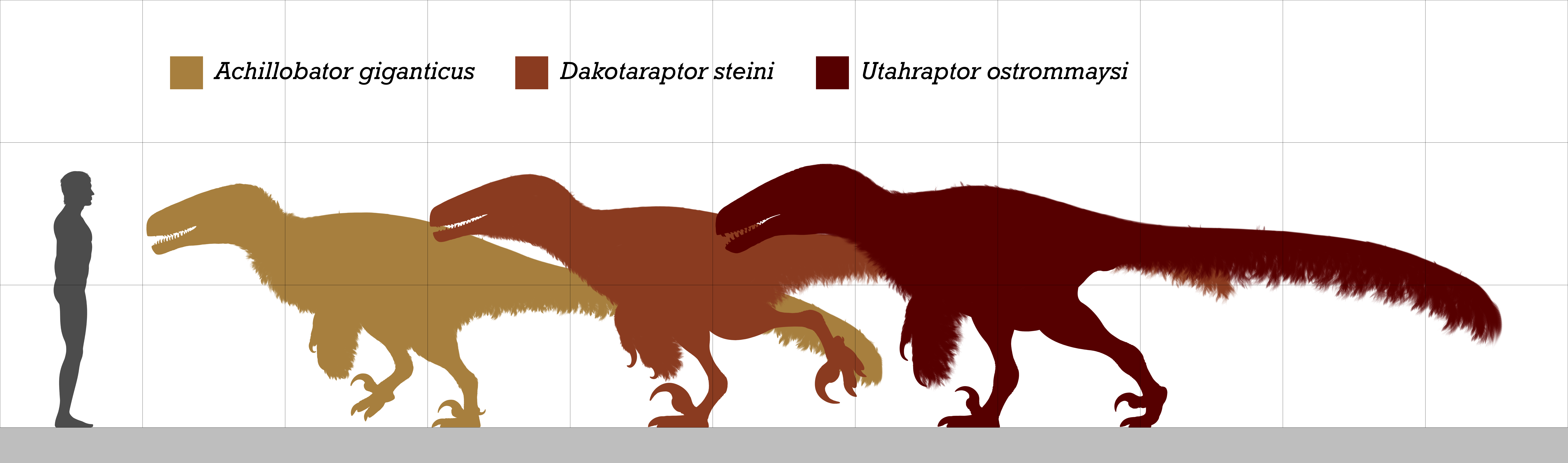
The size of three of the largest eudromaeosaurs compared to a human

Eudromaeosaurs likely evolved from small ancestors, only around 1 kilogram (2.2 lb) in mass. Later eudromaeosaurs were generally larger than this, with most being less than 2–3 metres (6.6–9.8 ft) long and having masses estimated at around 15–40 kilograms (33–88 lb).

Eudromaeosaurs are also known to have reached relatively large sizes. Among these were the dromaeosaurines Achillobator, at around 6 metres (20 ft), and Utahraptor at up to 7 metres (23 ft). The largest eudromaeosaurs are estimated to have been more than 200 kilograms (440 lb) in mass. At least one velociraptorine taxon may have achieved gigantic sizes comparable to those found among the dromaeosaurines. So far, this unnamed giant velociraptorine is known only from isolated teeth found on the Isle of Wight, England. The teeth appear to have belonged to an animal similar in size to the North American genus Utahraptor, but the morphology of the teeth suggests that the large size may only be homoplastic. Remains from giant eudromaeosaurs are also reported from the Bissekty and Bayan Shireh formations.

=== Skull and tooth morphology ===
Skull diagram of Dromaeosaurus

The main difference in the skull morphology of eudromaeosaur species that has been observed is that those known from Asia have typically narrower skulls than those in North America. This is generally attributed to a phylogenetic difference (most Asian eudromaeosaurs are considered to be velociraptorines), but an analysis by Mark Powers and colleagues in 2020 demonstrated that dromaeosaur snouts in general increased in length during the Cretaceous. The reason for this is not fully understood, but it has been suggested that this reflects a change in the preferred prey of dromaeosaurs that existed from the Early Cretaceous to the Late Cretaceous.

Eudromaeosaur skulls are also relatively solid in comparison to their primitive coelurosaur ancestors (i.e. they had smaller paranasal sinuses). In particular, the skull pneumaticity of oviraptorosaurs, which share a common ancestor with both birds and eudromaeosaurs is much higher than in any eudromaeosaurs. A 2021 survey of the premaxillae, maxillae, nasals, lacrimals, and jugals of several eudromaeosaurs was conducted in an attempt to reconstruct the ancestral condition of facial pneumaticity for coelurosaurs. The pneumatic elements of all five bones show a marked decline from basal coelurosaurs to derived paravians, with eudromaeosaurs completely lacking pneumatic spaces in their premaxillae. The reason for this evolutionary trend is unclear.

Compared to other clades of theropods, eudromaeosaurs exhibited relatively little variation in the dimensions of their skulls. Some researchers have suggested that this is a result of their relatively conservative ecology. According to this estimation, most eudromaeosaurs are hypercarnivores of prey similar in size or larger than themselves, which imposes constraints on the functionally effective range of skull shapes. In the same analysis, it is suggested that the earliest eudromaeosaurs had skulls more like velociraptorines than dromaeosaurines or saurornitholestines due to the morphological similarity of troodontid skulls (believed to be the closest relatives of dromaeosaurids).

The teeth of dromaeosaurines differed from those of velociraptorines in having a low DSDI ratio (their teeth had equally sized serrations) on both the posterior and on the anterior edges. By contrast, velociraptorines often have larger serrations on the posterior side of the tooth, than the anterior, or no serrations on the anterior side at all.

=== Feathers and wings ===
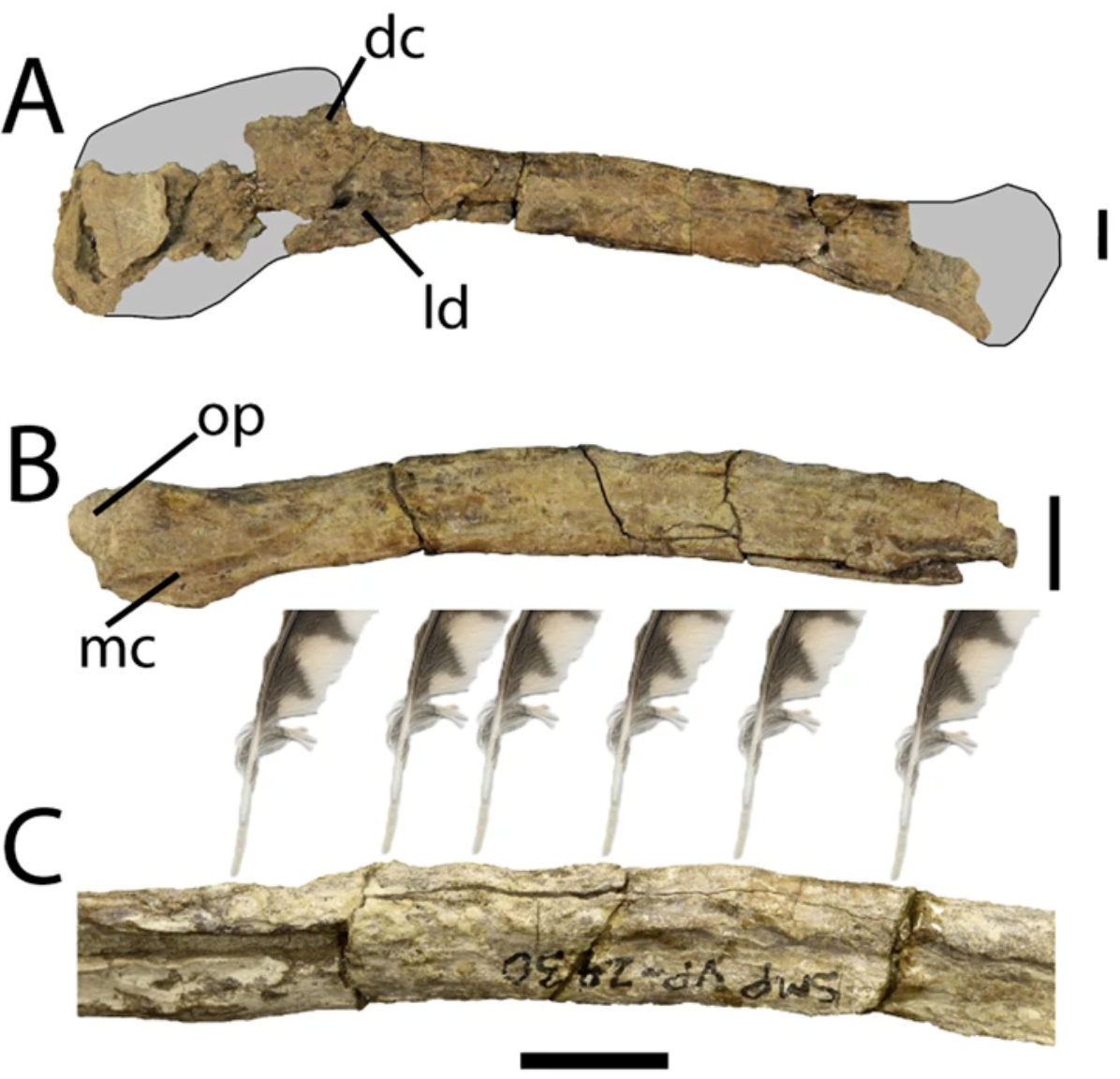
The ulna of Dineobellator showing the position of the quill knobs

Throughout the 1990s and early 2000s, a variety of fossil discoveries from the Yixian and Jiufotang formations demonstrated that many small microraptorian dromaeosaurids were covered in coats of feathers and possessed fully asymmetrical pennaceous wing feathers. Among such discoveries were the small dromaeosaurs Sinornithosaurus, Microraptor, Changyuraptor, Zhenyuanlong, Wulong, Daurlong, and at least one unnamed taxon (specimen IVPP V13476).

In 2007 paleontologists studied the ulna of a specimen of Velociraptor and discovered small bumps on the surface, known as quill knobs. The same feature is present in some bird bones, and represents the attachment point for strong secondary wing feathers. This finding provided the first direct evidence that eudromaeosaurs had feathers. In the years since, similar indirect evidence of feathers in true eudromaeosaurs has been found for the genera Dakotaraptor and Dineobellator.

Today, it is generally believed that most, if not all coelurosaurs had a coat of filamentous feathers. Based on the available evidence it is likely that all paravians and oviraptorosaurs (and possibly ornithomimosaurs) had pennaceous wing feathers on their arms.

=== Feet and claws ===
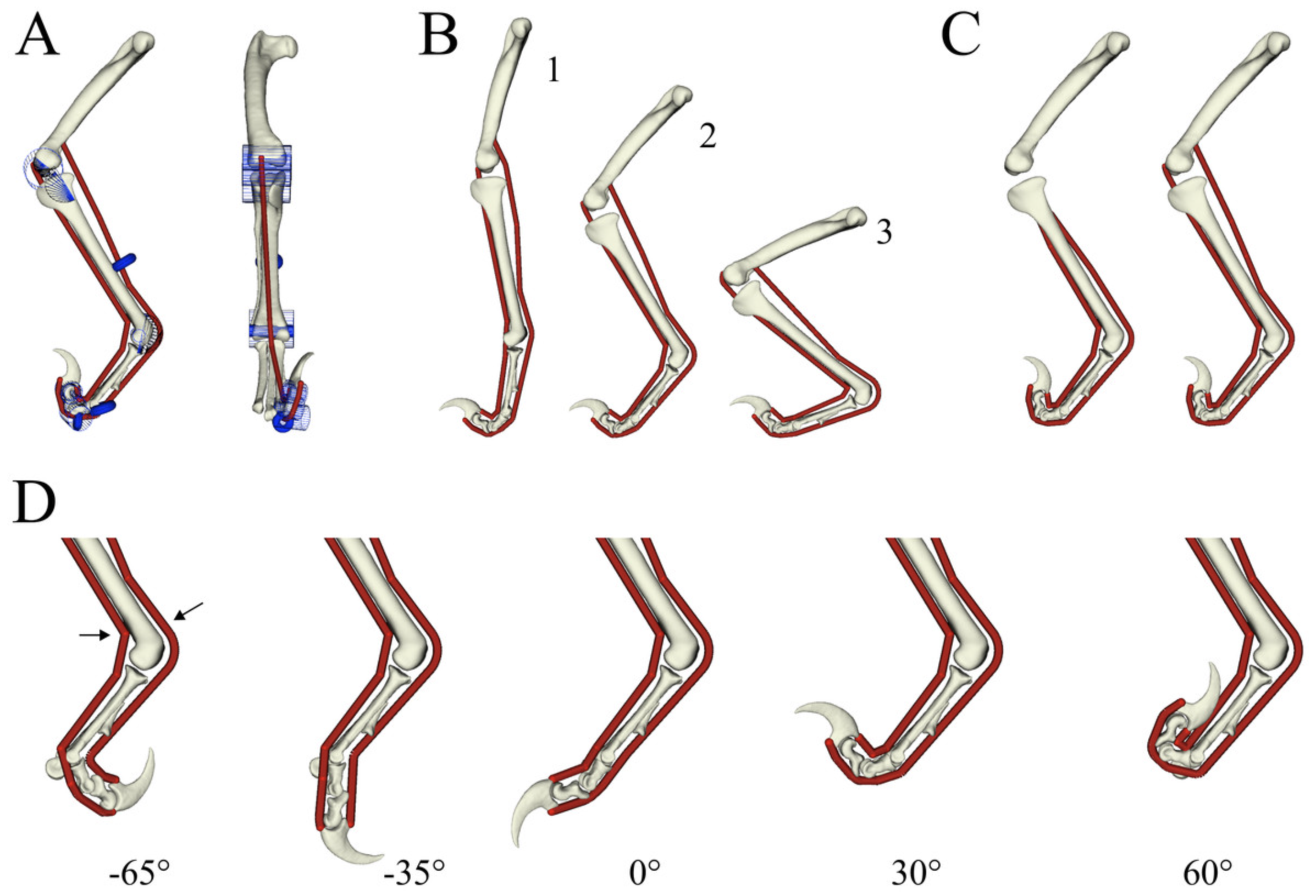
A reconstruction of the leg musculature of Deinonychus, emblematic of the condition in eudromaeosaurs

The leg proportions of eudromaeosaurs differed considerably from other maniraptorans and also from the closely related microraptorian dromaeosaurids. Most of these taxa possessed short femora with long tibiae and metatarsals, which are generally accepted to have been adaptations for cursoriality. Conversely, eudromaeosaurs had long femora and tibiae but relatively short metatarsals. The exact reasons for these adaptations are not fully understood, but some authors have suggested that this is an adaptation to improve the strength and robustness of the legs for the purpose of using their feet during predation.

Aside from their generally larger size when compared to earlier-diverging dromaeosaurids, eudromaeosaurs are characterized by several features of the foot. First, differences existed in the positions of the grooves that anchored blood vessels and keratin sheathes of the toe claws. In primitive dromaeosaurids like Hesperonychus, these grooves ran parallel to each other on either side of the claw along its length. In eudromaeosaurs, the grooves were asymmetrical, with the inner one split into two distinct grooves and elevated toward the top of the claw, while the single outer groove remained positioned at the midline.

The second distinguishing characteristic of eudromaeosaurs is an expanded and enlarged "heel" on the last bone in the second toe (phalanx), which bore the enlarged, sickle-like toe claw. Finally, the first bone of the second toe also possessed an enlarged expansion at the joint, another adaptation relating to the unusually enlarged claw, and which helped the animal hold the claw high off the ground. Also unlike their more basal relatives, the sickle claw of eudromaeosaurs was sharper and more blade-like. In unenlagiines and microraptorines, the claw is broader at its base.

=== Tail ===
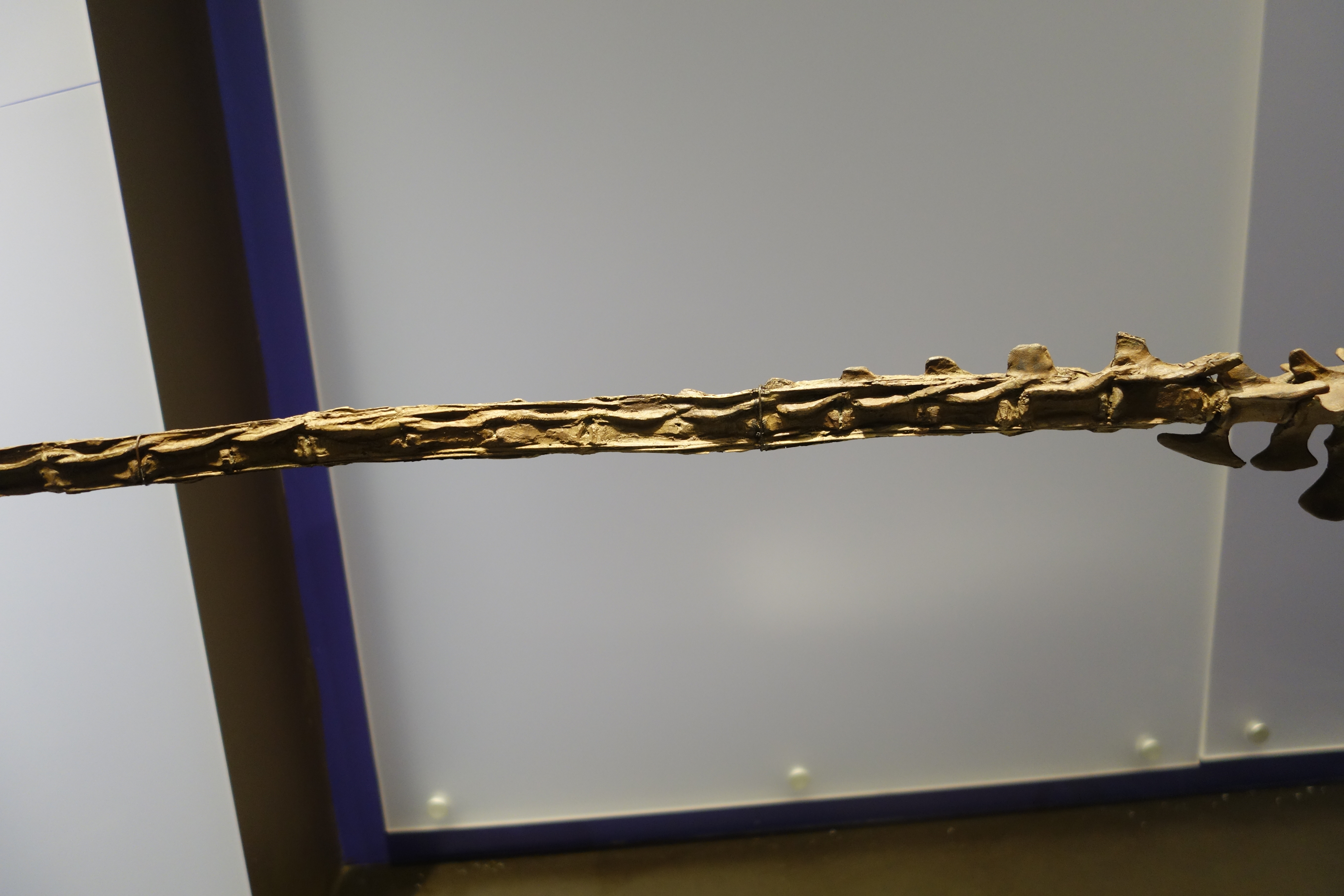
The tail of Dromaeosaurus

One of the most archetypal eudromaeosaurs, Deinonychus antirrhopus, was given its specific epithet ("antirrhopus" meaning "counterbalanced") in recognition of its very long and rigid tail. This feature is generally conserved across Eudromaeosauria. Most eudromaeosaurs for which the caudal vertebrae are known have more such vertebrae than their maniraptoran relatives. They generally had more than 30 caudal vertebrae, with at least the nine most anterior vertebrae bearing transverse processes.

Eudromaeosaurs also possess structures called "caudotheca", which are highly elongated prezygapophyses and chevrons. These elongations of the bone encase the caudal vertebrae and form a rod-like structure. In some derived dromaeosaurines — namely Achillobator, Utahraptor, and Yurgovuchia — the caudotheca are reduced in length in comparison with related taxa. The caudotheca were initially suggested by John Ostrom to have been formed by the ossification of tendons in the tail, but this has not been supported by modern researchers.

The tails of non-avian paravians, including eudromaeosaurs, are composed of vertebrae of two different shapes. The anterior caudal vertebrae are very typical of the shape of other coelurosaurs. The posterior caudal vertebrae, on the other hand, are marked by a loss of their transverse processes, a reduction in their neural spines, and the haemal arches take the shape of an upside-down 'T' in cross-section. The centra of the posterior caudals are also highly elongated. Unlike most other coelurosaurs, this transition in the shape of the vertebrae is abrupt, rather than having a gradual change in morphology. This condition is called a "Type-2 Transition", to contrast with the similarly bifurcated, but morphologically distinct, "Type-1 Transition" seen in ornithomimosaurs.

== Paleobiology and behavior ==
=== Skull function ===
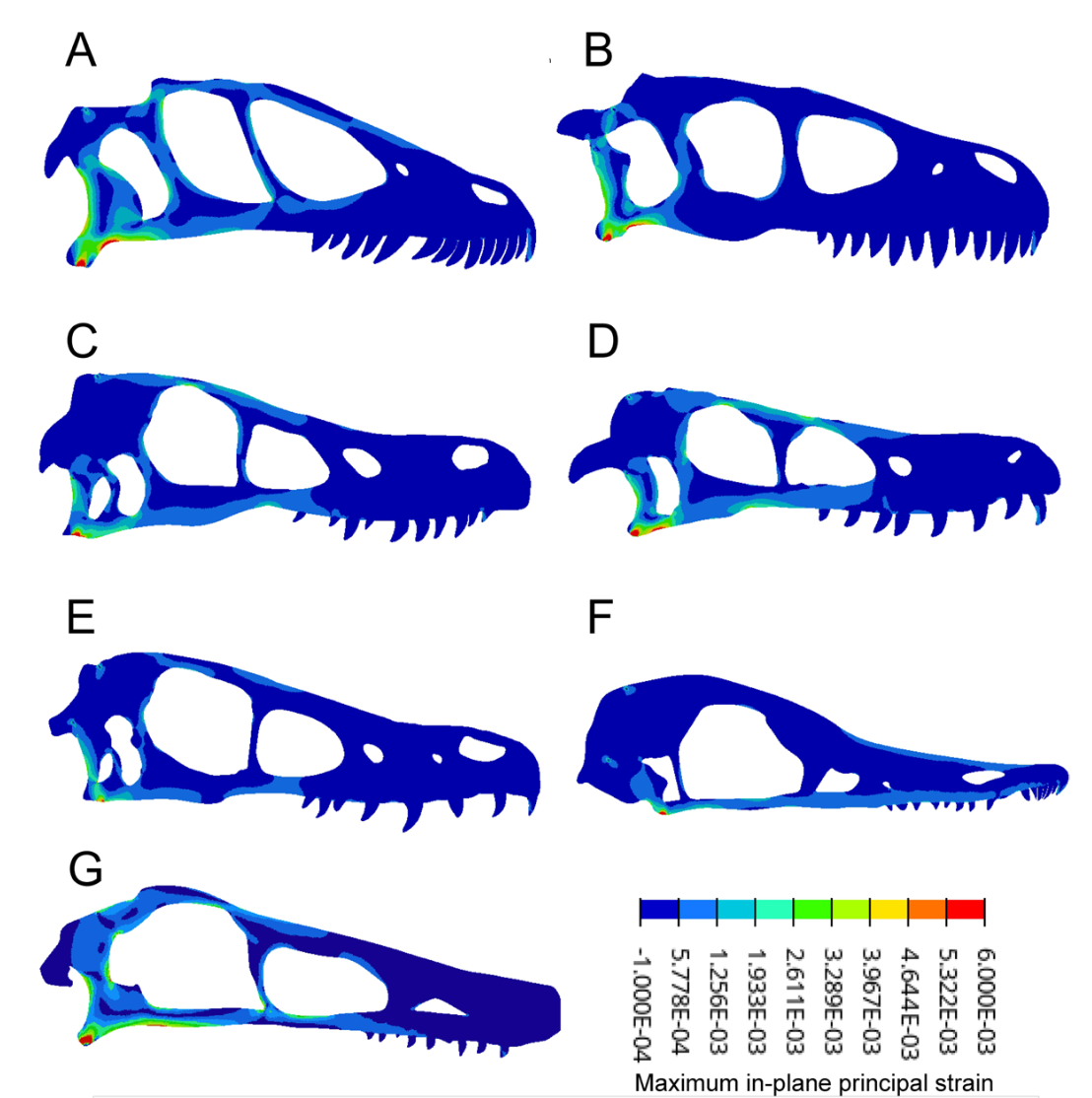
Finite element analysis results testing the strain on the skulls of several eudromaeosaurs (A-E), Halzskaraptor (F), and Gobivenator (G)

Eudromaeosaur skulls have been characterized in the scientific literature as being relatively conservative in comparison to their maniraptoran relatives. The skulls had few pneumatic spaces, especially in comparison to birds and oviraptorosaurs and retained the slightly tapered rostrum of primitive tetanurans without any significant changes in length or depth. This is largely a result of the dietary ecology of eudromaeosaurs, which took on a traditionally carnivorous role in contrast to all other maniraptorans, which were either herbivorous or omnivorous.

A 2024 paper studying eudromaeosaur skulls performed several analyses, including finite element analysis (FEA) in an attempt to infer their physical properties. Their results supported the hypothesis that Deinonychus was adapted to hunt large prey (especially the sympatric ornithopod Tenontosaurus) due to a suggested relatively high bite force and slow bite speed. The same analysis recovered a relatively high mechanical advantage for the skull of Dromaeosaurus and a high resistance to bending, both of which are associated with tackling large vertebrate prey. This is consistent with the loss of pneumatic elements in the facial bones of eudromaeosaurs, which have been suggested to be adaptations for subduing and feeding on large prey.

In velociraptorine taxa, the structure of the fenestrae in the skull are adapted for dispersing the strain of any force exerted on it throughout the skull, which leads to less strain on each of the individual points of leverage on the skull. Similarities between velociraptorines and troodontids led the authors to suggest that a velociraptorine skull condition may be ancestral to eudromaeosaurs. Other researchers have suggested that the fenestration of the velociraptorine skull is a derived condition resulting from the expansion of cranial sinuses. Another study of theropod bite forces suggested that Dromaeosaurus and Saurornitholestes were better adapted to crushing the bones of relatively small prey.

=== Metabolism and thermoregulation ===
All eudromaeosaurs (and coelurosaurs in general) are presumed to have been endotherms. The presence of feathers has been suggested to have been an adaptation initially developed for insulation, which would be of limited use to fully ectothermic organisms. Therefore, the presence of feathers can probably be used to indirectly infer the presence of endothermy. However, eudromaeosaurs were likely not as efficient in their thermoregulation as modern mammals or birds and were believed to have possessed a lower average metabolic rate than these modern animals.

In a 2023 study of the skull anatomy of several extinct and extant theropods used computed tomography to model the volumes of their nasal cavities and compare them to the volumes of the skulls as a whole. These were subjected to a regression analysis which recovered a relationship between these two volumes and the efficiency of the nasal passage as a thermoregulatory apparatus. Under this analysis, the eudromaeosaur tested, Velociraptor, was suggested to have been capable of much less efficient nasal thermoregulation than modern birds. This is consistent with earlier suggestions that dromaeosaurs had a lower metabolic rate than modern birds.

=== Arm and wing function ===
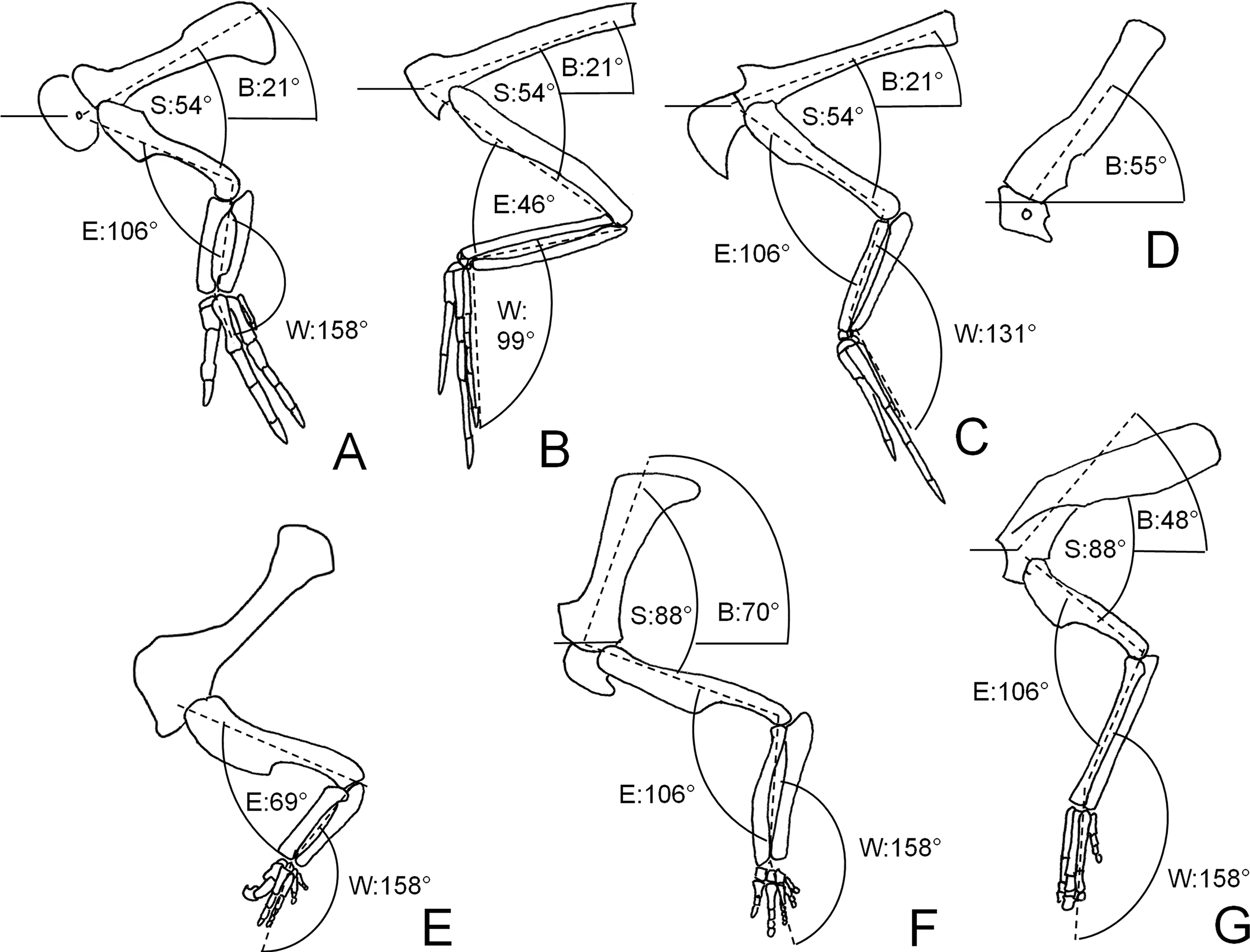
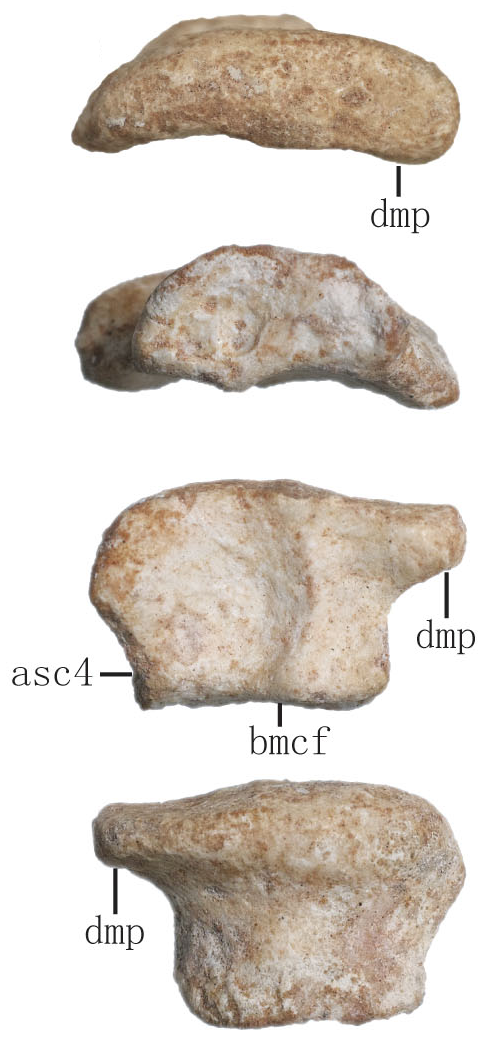
Diagram of the arms of several dinosaurs including maniraptorans (left); semilunate carpal of Linheraptor (right)

Like most paravians, eudromaeosaurs possessed a highly derived semilunate carpal formed by the co-ossification of the three distal-most carpal bones. This condition allows for the hand to be folded flat against the ulna in order to hold their wings close to the body. The resting position of the elbow would likely have been an extremely acute angle for eudromaeosaurs, with the wings held close to the body, but not fully folded in the manner of modern birds.

The mobility capabilities of eudromaeosaur arms were reconstructed in a 2006 analysis which used both direct observation of skeletal muscle correlates and phylogenetic inferences based on extant taxa. Among modern birds, tinamous and neognaths are believed to have had shoulder anatomy most similar to eudromaeosaurs, whereas most ratites are believed to have secondarily lost a significant amount of shoulder mobility. The skeletons of several eudromaeosaurs, including Velociraptor and Saurornitholestes, were compared and preserved many elements homologous with the arm musculature of both Sphenosuchus and Archaeopteryx, implying a relatively conservative archosaur shoulder musculature. One major difference found was that Dromaeosaurus and some similar taxa possibly possessed relatively strong biceps compared to other maniraptorans of a similar size.

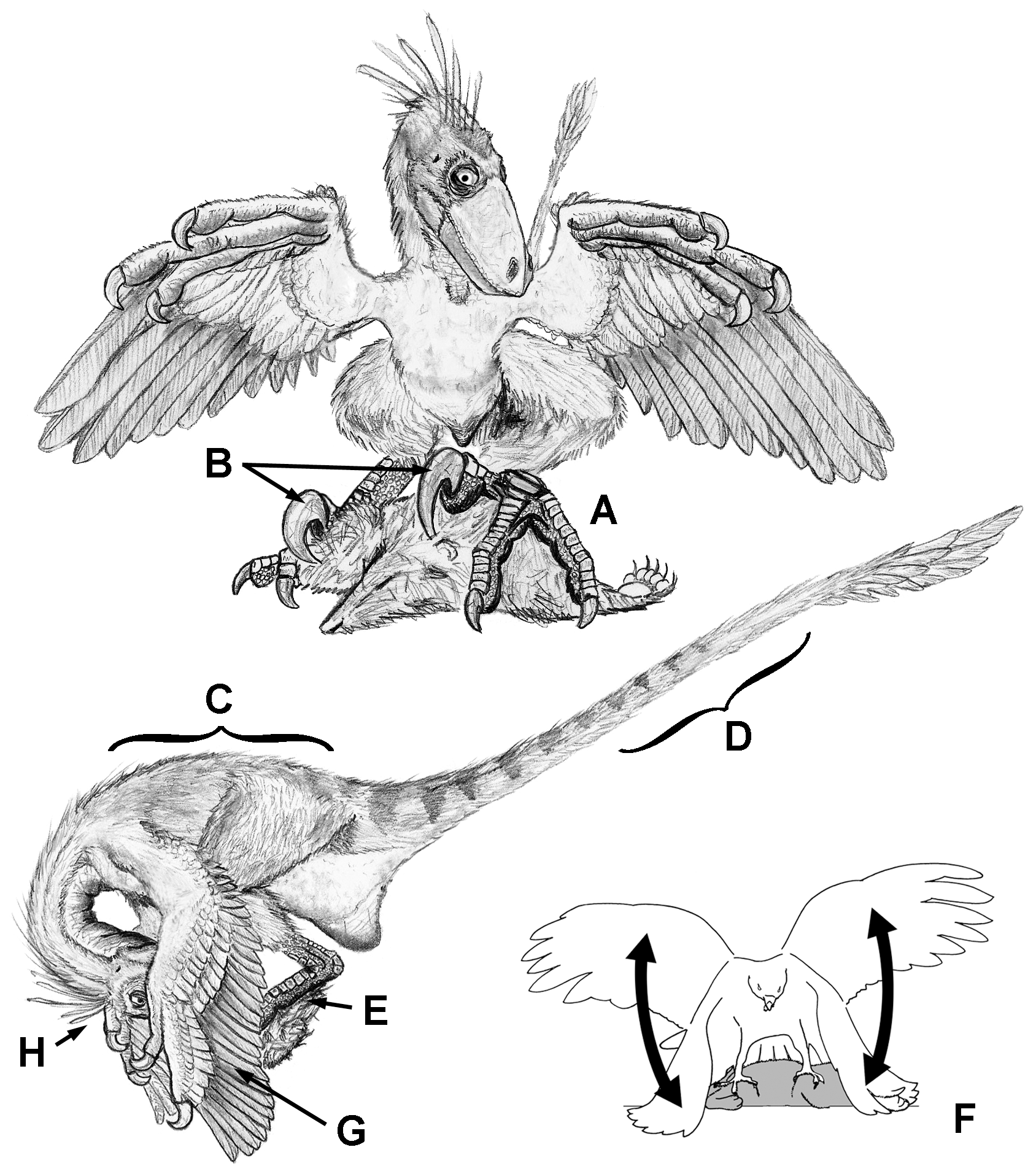
A depiction of a dromaeosaur using its wings to stabilize itself while feeding on live prey

The arm function of Deinonychus and Saurornitholestes has also been studied in detail in order to infer the estimated total range of motion for the arms. The remains of these genera were modeled, articulated, and measured based on the morphology of the articular surfaces of the limb bones. Several functional hypotheses were suggested and the results of the modeling were used to falsify these hypotheses. It was inferred from this analysis that it was impossible for eudromaeosaurs to use their hands to dig, scratch themselves, probe small crevices, or carry objects with a single hand. Other functional uses for the arms and hands such as carrying objects with both hands, maintain balance, or bring objects to its mouth to feed could not be falsified. Velociraptor, despite being known from very complete remains, has not had its forelimb mobility extensively studied because most of the specimens are preserved fully articulated and have not been fully removed from the rocks in which they were found.

The hypothesis that eudromaeosaurs used the "raptor-prey-restraint" (or RPR) method of predation would be consistent with the morphology of their arms. The arms could exert a lot of force and were likely covered in long feathers. These may have been used as flapping stabilizers for balance while on top of a struggling prey animal, along with the long counterbalancing tail. These predatory adaptations working together may also have implications for the origin of flapping in paravians.

It has also been suggested that juvenile eudromaeosaurs may have been able to glide or display some aerial capabilities. This is based on the disproportionately long arm bones seen in juvenile specimens of Deinonychus. This likely would not include volant adeptness seen in modern birds due to the limited forearm mobility of the dromaeosaur arm. Deinonychus is also believed to have exhibited considerable shoulder mobility due to the morphology of the scapular glenoid which, when coupled with the expanded muscle attachment sites near the wrists of these juveniles, may have enabled a mechanism approaching the "flapping" capabilities of birds. The general morphology of the upper-body in juvenile Deinonychus, including the longer bones and the increased robustness in the shoulder girdle, also closely resembles the condition seen in other dromaeosaurids like Microraptor, Changyuraptor, and Sinornithosaurus, all of which have been suggested to be capable of powered flight.

=== Claw function ===
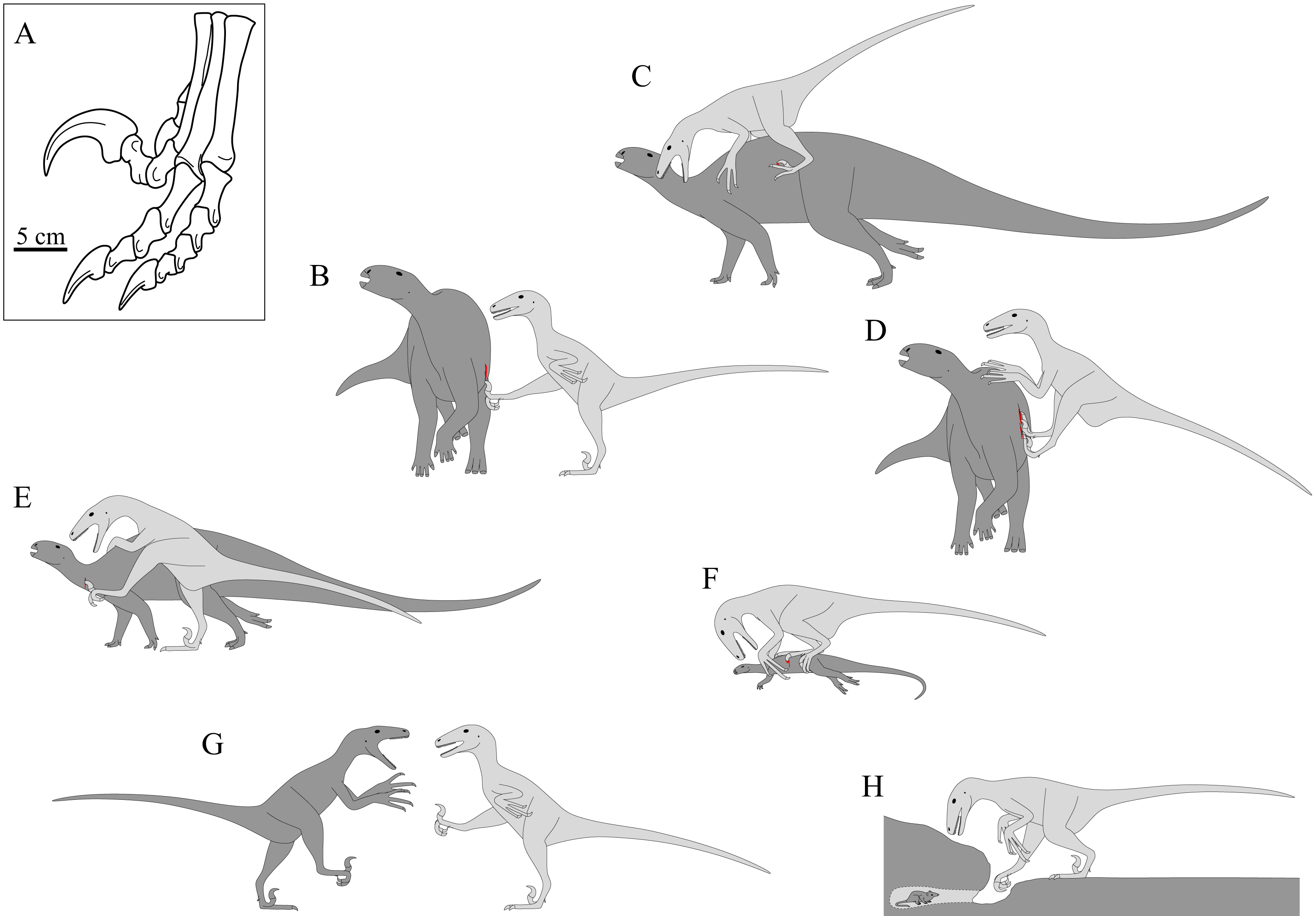
A diagram showing possible functions of the sickle-claw in eudromaeosaurs

Eudromaeosaurs and their close relatives have a completely novel foot and claw morphology among theropods. Their second toe being very muscular and strongly curled up off the ground. This second toe bears the iconic sickle-shaped pedal claw that resembles the talons of birds of prey, from which many dromaeosaurs derive their names ("raptor" being a common generic suffix). This unique morphology has led to considerable speculation regarding the possible in-life function of the dromaeosaur foot.

In 2005, a group of researchers led by Philip Manning constructed a robotic reconstruction of the leg of the eudromaeosaur Deinonychus in order to model possible functions for the hypertrophied second pedal claw. They expressed doubt in John Ostrom's original suggestion that the claws were used as slashing weapons, and the experiment they conducted using the robotic leg seemed to confirm that the claws were very effective at piercing but relatively ineffective at creating gashes once a surface was pierced. Their tentative conclusion was that Deinonychus (and possibly other eudromaeosaurs) would have used their claws to climb onto the hides of large prey animals like Tenontosaurus in order to inflict wounds with their mouths.

Manning conducted a study in 2009 with a different group of co-authors to elaborate on the findings of his work in 2005. The authors used multiple analytical methods — including finite element analysis, X-ray tomography, and instrumented indentation testing — to examine the pedal claw of Velociraptor and compared their results to the extant taxon Bubo bubo. Their results concluded that the claws of Velociraptor would have been capable of bearing the estimated weight of the animal when embedded in a surface (either prey or a climbing surface). Comparisons between extant birds with varying claw curvatures led the authors to also conclude that Deinonychus was probably not capable of such feats. They also hypothesized that eudromaeosaurs possessed a very robust system of flexor tendons in their feet to form a ratchet-like locking mechanism that allowed them to use their feet to maintain a very tight grip. They also speculated that this ratchet-like grip may have been the reason the Velociraptor individual in the Fighting Dinosaurs may have been unable to disentangle itself from the Protoceratops, leading to both animals being killed.

In 2011, Denver Fowler and colleagues proposed a use for the sickle claws of eudromaeosaurs that they called "raptor prey restraint" (or RPR). According to this model, the primary function of eudromaeosaur claws would be to pin down and immobilize smaller prey animals while they are killed and dismembered by the mouth. The shift towards use of the feet as primary weapons of predation was suggested to be a result of the increasingly specialized wing anatomy of paravians. However, the wing anatomy was suggested to have a secondary role in feeding; they were suggested to be used as a means of stabilizing the eudromaeosaur while it fed on struggling prey. A point of indirect evidence for this behavior is that this method of predation is employed by many extant birds-of-prey.

Peter Bishop performed an analysis of the foot musculature of Deinonychus in 2019 which sought to examine a wider variety of possible functional uses for their pedal claws. A digital model of the leg of the animal was examined under several conditions to estimate the muscular optimization of different postures as a proxy for inferring potential in-life behaviors. The possible uses examined were slash-kicking prey, hanging onto the sides of larger prey, pouncing onto the backs of larger prey, piercing prey's weak-points (i.e. the neck and belly), pinning down smaller prey to feed, intraspecific combat, and scratch-digging for small prey. Bishop's analysis concluded that the leg musculature of Deinonychus — and by extension other eudromaeosaurs — was most conducive to the use of their claws to hold-down smaller prey to kill or feed on them. This supports the earlier-proposed raptor prey restraint method of killing prey from Fowler and colleagues. He also found that the use of claws for digging or targeting weak-points on large prey items were also supported.

=== Sensory capabilities ===
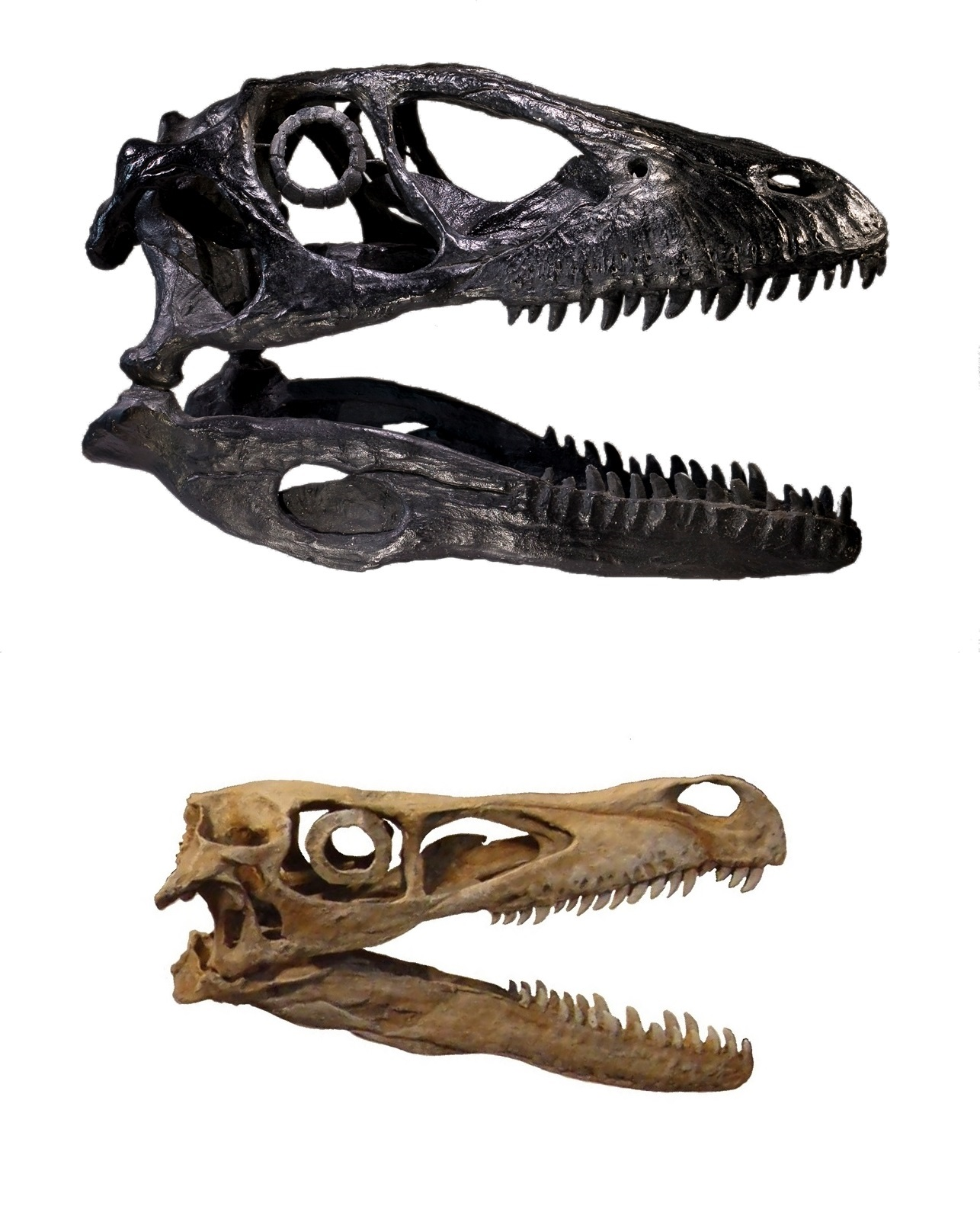
Casts of the skulls of Deinonychus (top) and Velociraptor (bottom) with the scleral rings visible inside the orbits

A 2011 study on the scleral rings of extinct archosaurs by Lars Schmitz and Ryosuke Motani used the morphology and diameter of these structures to estimate the temporal habits of various extinct groups. The taxa they examined included pterosaurs, non-avian dinosaurs, prehistoric birds, and a few more primitive archosaurs. The dinosaurs they examined included three dromaeosaurs — the microraptorians Microraptor and Sinornithosaurus and the eudromaeosaur Velociraptor. The evidence they found, based on comparisons with extant species, suggested that Velociraptor was primarily active during the night. They also found that Protoceratops (a known prey animal for Velociraptor) would likely have been most active at dawn and dusk, suggesting that encounters between these animals would have mostly occurred around these times. Schmitz and Motani also found that Microraptor was likely mostly nocturnal and the closely related Sinornithosaurus would have been crepuscular. However, the authors stop short of suggesting what the ancestral condition for eudromaeosaurs may have been, citing a relatively small sample size.

Another analysis using a similar methodology with more taxa by Jonah Choiniere and colleagues was conducted in 2021 which examined scleral morphology of a wide range of pterosaurs, birds, and non-avian dinosaurs. Among their sample were the taxa Tsaagan, Linheraptor, Dromaeosaurus, and Velociraptor, whose sensory capabilities were assessed using the morphology of their scleral rings and the endosseous cochlear ducts (ECDs) of their inner-ears. Similarly to the Schmitz and Motani analysis, Velociraptor was found to be highly adapted for nocturnality; it had large scleral diameter and elongated ECDs, which suggest high visual acuity and very sensitive hearing. Both of these are consistent with the morphology of a nocturnal predator. The closely related Linheraptor was also suggested to have adaptations for nocturnality, although the ECDs of Linheraptor are not preserved. Dromaeosaurus and Tsaagan were found to have only limited elongation in their ECDs, comparable to some nocturnal birds, but ECD length and nocturnality do not appear to be very tightly correlated.

Archosaur cochlear shape elongated in a relatively linear fashion on the line towards birds, which was suggested by Michael Hanson and colleagues to be a paedomorphic adaptation to hear the high-pitched vocalizations of juveniles of the same species. This line of evidence is also used to suggest that parental care evolved early in the evolution of archosaurs, and therefore would have been present in eudromaeosaurs. The high-pitched calls of juvenile dromaeosaurs would have been distinct and differentiable to the parents' ears from other ambient noise.

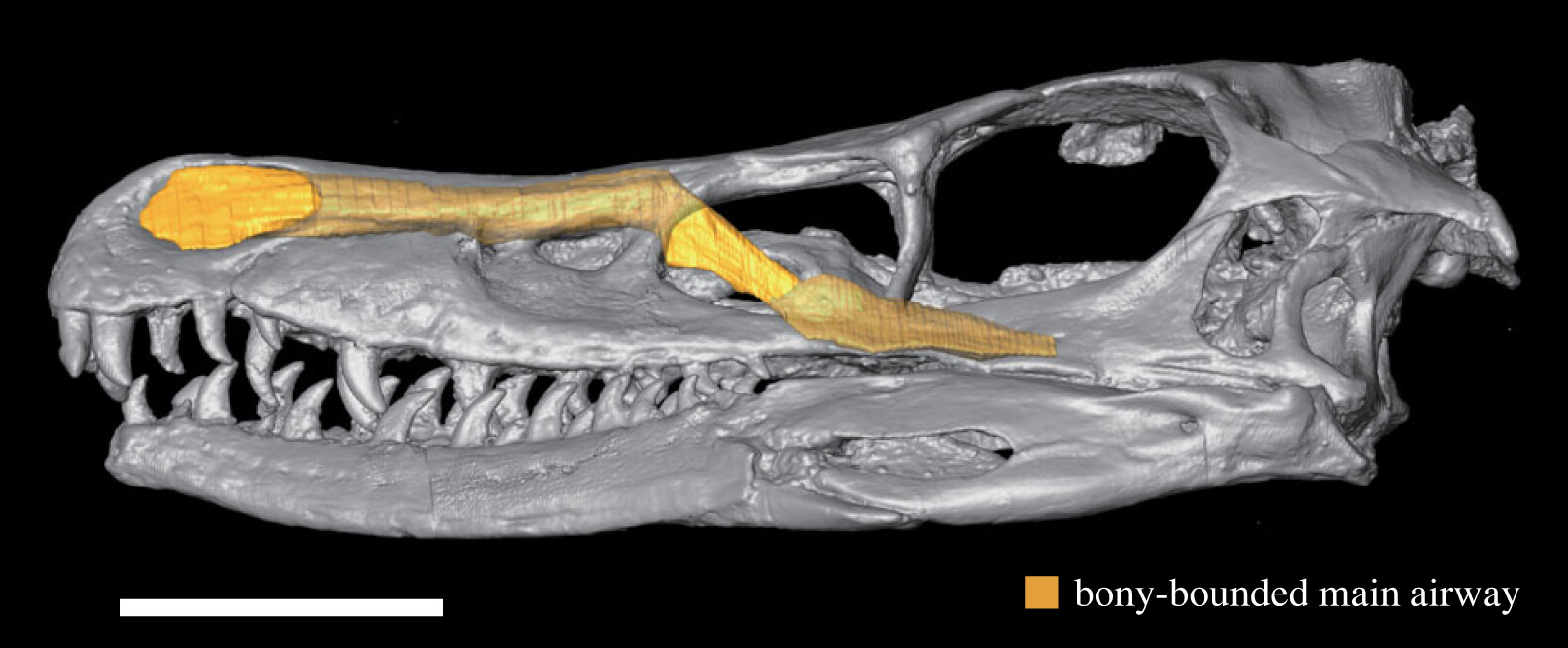
A CT scan of a Velociraptor skull showing the nasal cavity in yellow

Olfaction in eudromaeosaurs has not been studied as extensively as other theropod taxa (such as tyrannosaurids) due to the relative lack of complete skull material. However, extensive cranial remains are known from Velociraptor, Bambiraptor, and Saurornitholestes, which allowed the allometry of their nasal volume to be compared to other non-avian theropods. These three eudromaeosaurs were found to have higher nasal volume to body mass ratios than other groups of maniraptorans and were more comparable to tyrannosaurids in that respect. This ratio was hypothesized to be a proxy measurement of olfactory acuity, suggesting that eudromaeosaurs had strong senses of smell. This is also consistent with the suggestion that these predators were primarily active in low-light conditions. However, it is also possible that this is reflective of large territories patrolled by these taxa.

=== Reproduction ===
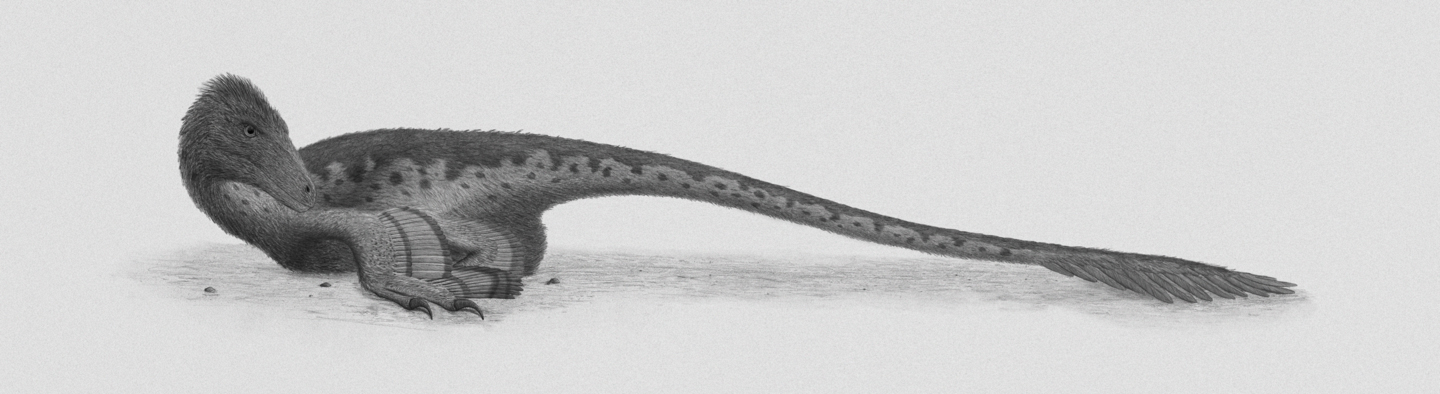
A life reconstruction of Deinonychus brooding with the aid of its wings

The only egg fossils confidently referable to a named eudromaeosaur are the eggs found associated with the Deinonychus specimen AMNH 3015. This partial skeleton was identified as Deinonychus based on the shape of the preserved gastralia, and it was believed to have been brooding when it was killed and fossilized. The eggs were confirmed to be the eggs of theropods based on the microstructure of their shells, which were similar to the eggs of the oviraptorid Citipati, and the skeleton was identified as belonging to a sexually mature adult. The arrangement of the eggs in the nest and the assumed brooding posture of the adult led researchers to suggest that Deinonychus laid open nests and attended them until they hatched.

The oospecies Gannanoolithus yingliangi was named in 2024, and is believed to belong to a eudromaeosaur. The oofossils were found in the Lianhe Formation near Ganzhou in southern China and were attributed to a dromaeosaur based on the microstructure of the eggshell and the similarities to the putative Deinonychus eggs listed above. Based on this morphology, the authors of the description of Gannanoolithus suggested that the existing oogenera Paraelongatoolithus and Elipsoolithus may also belong to dromaeosaurs, rather than oviraptorosaurs (which was their original assignment). Gannanoolithus specimens were also found in pairs, which suggests that eudromaeosaurs may have had paired oviducts similar to troodontids and oviraptorosaurs.

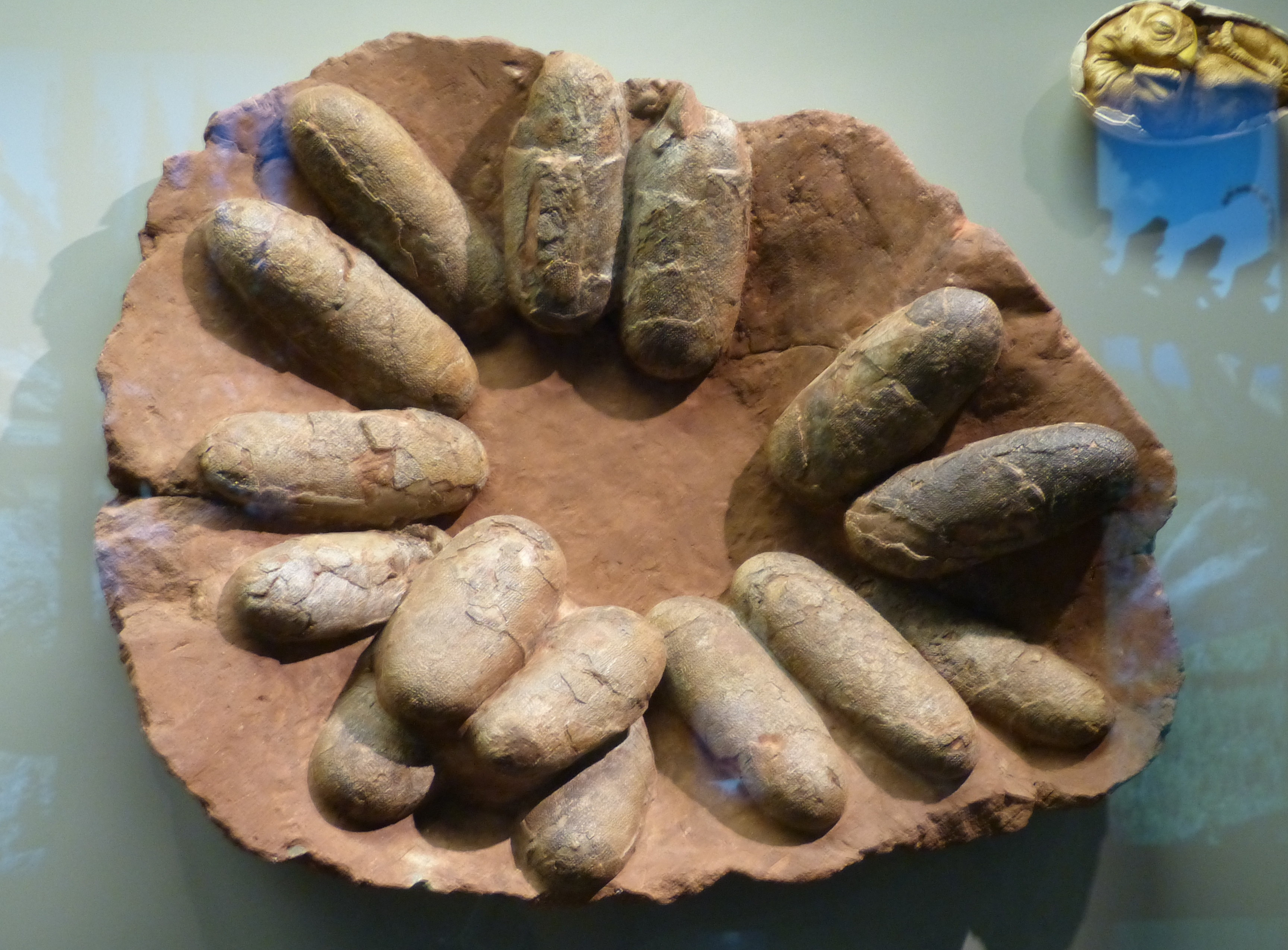
Fossilized dinosaur eggs arranged in the paired manner that eudromaeosaurs may have nested in

Dinosaurs are unique among amniotes as being the only group of animals with colored eggs. All other egg-laying amniotes (lepidosaurs, turtles, crocodylians, and monotremes) lay eggs which are plain white in color. Birds, on the other hand (which are dinosaurs), can lay eggs that exhibit a wide variety of colors: green in the case of emus, blue in the case of American robins, and many others. The pigments that produce these colors in bird eggs — protoporphyrin and biliverdin — have been observed in fossilized dinosaur eggs. The pigment structure found in the eggs attributable to Deinonychus, the oviraptorid Heyuannia, and the troodontid AMNH FARB 6631 are almost identical to those found in the eggs of emus. This suggests that the ancestral color of eggs in pennaraptorans, including eudromaeosaurs, was likely bluish-green in coloration. The cause of this evolutionary change is uncertain, but it has been suggested to be an adaptation for camouflage from predators.

The finding of very young juvenile eudromaeosaur remains in the Prince Creek Formation of Alaska also has implications for their reproductive strategy. Young individuals with multiple lines of arrested growth indicates that these animals were living within the Arctic Circle year-round and were non-migratory. This suggests that eudromaeosaurs were capable of nesting and brooding in the high arctic.

=== Growth and ontogeny ===
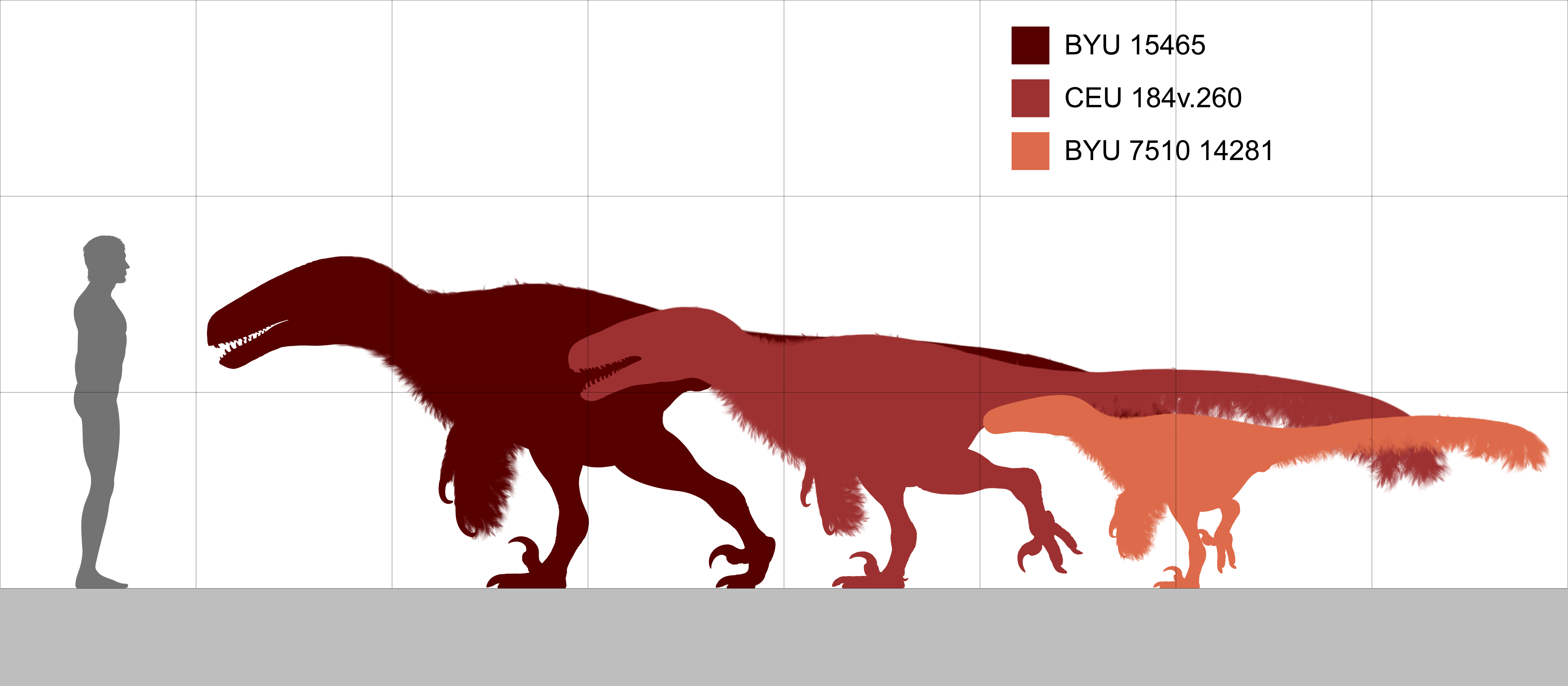
Differently-sized specimens of Utahraptor at presumed different ontogenetic ages

Direct evidence of parental care is known for some dinosaurs such as Maiasaura and many species of modern birds. However, there is only indirect evidence for parental care in eudromaeosaurs. The existence of a mixed-age assemblage of Utahraptor skeletons which has yet to be scientifically described suggests that at least some age groups lived together, which may have included the offspring of the adult group members. The inner-ear morphology of Velociraptor and other eudromaeosaurs also suggests that they would have been able to discriminate very high-pitched sounds, which was possibly an adaptation for hearing the calls of their offspring in times of distress.

The relative paucity of remains from most eudromaeosaur taxa make definitive statements about their general ontogeny difficult. Only a few taxa are represented by specimens of multiple ages. One of these, Deinonychus, is known from both juvenile and adults specimens. Based on examination of these specimens, it is known that juvenile Deinonychus differed from the adults of the same species by the presence of interdental plates, a relatively narrow mandible, and several features of the vertebrae. Another feature found in multiple juvenile eudromaeosaurs is the presence of small foramina on the articulating surfaces of the vertebral centra.

Notably, William and Kristen Parsons have suggested that Deinonychus (and possibly other eudromaeosaurs) may have been paedomorphically capable of flight. This is inferred based on the estimated range of motion of the shoulders and humeri and the relatively longer arm bones. The suggested flying ability of other members of Dromaeosauridae (particularly microraptorians) has led some researchers to suggest that dromaeosaurids were ancestrally volant.

Growth and maturation rates of eudromaeosaurs — and non-avian dinosaurs in general — have been difficult to estimate. The closest modern analogues, birds and crocodilians, have very different growth patterns; birds reach sexual maturity after reaching somatic maturity, whereas most reptiles reach sexual maturity around the same time as or before somatic maturity. However, it is not known when the avian condition evolved, so either condition is possible for the ontogeny of non-avian dinosaurs. A 2007 study by Gregory Erickson and colleagues examined the biology of dinosaurs that are known to have engaged in brooding (including Deinonychus, Citipati, Oviraptor, and Troodon). The study examined the histology of the ribs and gastralia in brooding specimens in order to estimate their ages. The absence of an external fundamental system in several of the specimens (indicating the animals were still growing) led to the conclusion that the reptilian condition was present in eudromaeosaurs and their non-avian close relatives and that the avian condition originated after the diversification of paravians.

== Classification ==
=== Technical diagnosis ===
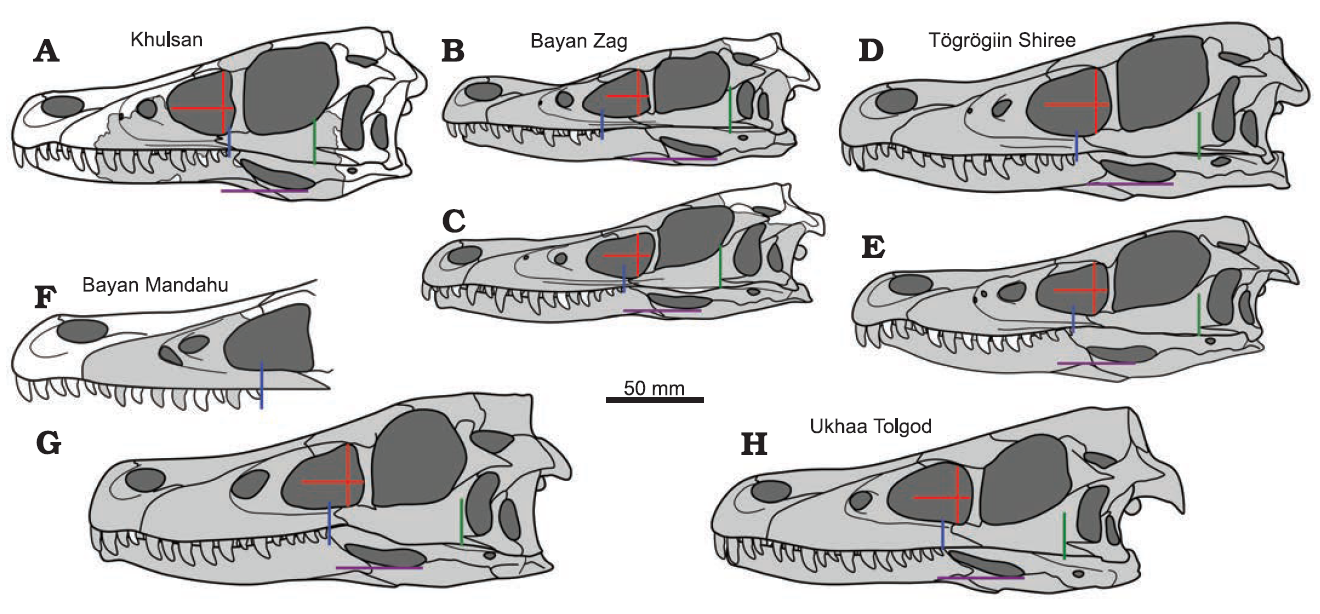
The skulls of several velociraptorine eudromaeosaurs compared side-by-side

The original definition of Eudromaeosauria was a node-based definition. It was defined as the least-inclusive clade containing Utahraptor ostrommaysi, Velociraptor mongoliensis, Deinonychus antirrhopus, and Saurornitholestes langstoni. The apomorphic features of the group were left unresolved at the time of its naming.

In 2012, Alan Turner, Mark Norell, and Peter Makovicky published a review of paravian systematics, which included a list of potential apomorphic characteristics for the group. These included a posteriorly-extending process of the premaxilla separating the maxilla from the nasal bone, a sharply demarcated process on the frontal bone along the orbital margin, a notch on the edge of the frontal near the lacrimal suture, a rounded internal mandibular fenestra, a shallow prootic process on the lateral side of the braincase, the lack of a carotid process on the posterior cervical vertebrae, highly elongated centra in the dorsal vertebrae, and a shortened acromio process of the scapula that does not project anteriorly to the coracoids.

Mark Powers and several colleagues, including Alan Turner, published a second review of the literature in 2021 in relation to eudromaeosaurs specifically. They recovered a monophyletic Eudromaeosauria with several synapomorphies. These included a frontal that is "L"-shaped in dorsal view, a short coracoid, and second metatarsal much shorter than the four metatarsal. They also recovered some more weakly supported synapomorphies including a paroccipital process that is dorsally twisted, short and relatively massive posterior dorsal vertebrae, and coracoids that are weakly flexed.

=== Relationships ===
One of the primary phylogenetic matrices in the scientific literature is the so-called "TWiG Matrix" from the Theropod Working Group. This matrix was first published on by Steven Brusatte and colleagues in 2014 in a comprehensive analysis of coelurosaur phylogeny. This matrix included 150 taxa coded for 853 anatomical characters. This matrix has been elaborated upon with the addition of new taxa by several authors, and it remains one of the foremost datasets in modern theropod systematics. A cladogram showing the affinities of Eudromaeosauria within Paraves based on the TWiG Matrix from Napoli and colleagues (2021) is shown below.

- Pennaraptora
  - Oviraptorosauria
  - Paraves
    - Avialae
    - Deinonychosauria
      - Troodontidae
      - Dromaeosauridae
        - Halszkaraptorinae
        - - Unenlagiinae
          - - Microraptoria
            - Eudromaeosauria

This classification scheme is the most conventional and widely used, but it is not universally accepted by researchers. There are several competing hypotheses regarding the interrelationships of paravian dinosaurs including those posed by Andrea Cau and colleagues in 2017, Scott Hartman and colleagues in 2019, and Matías Motta and colleagues in 2020.

=== Subgroups ===
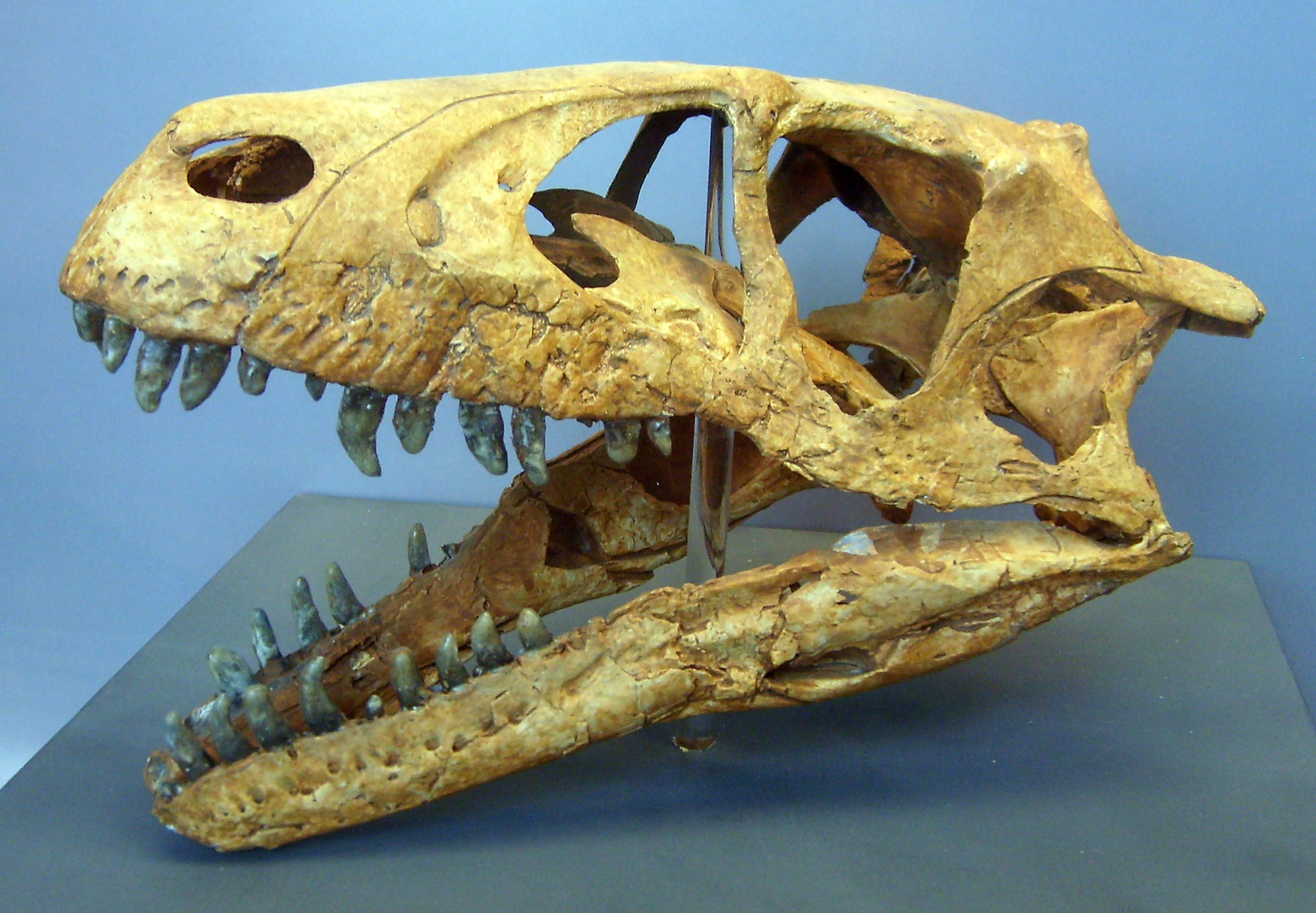
Dromaeosaurus albertensis (cast)

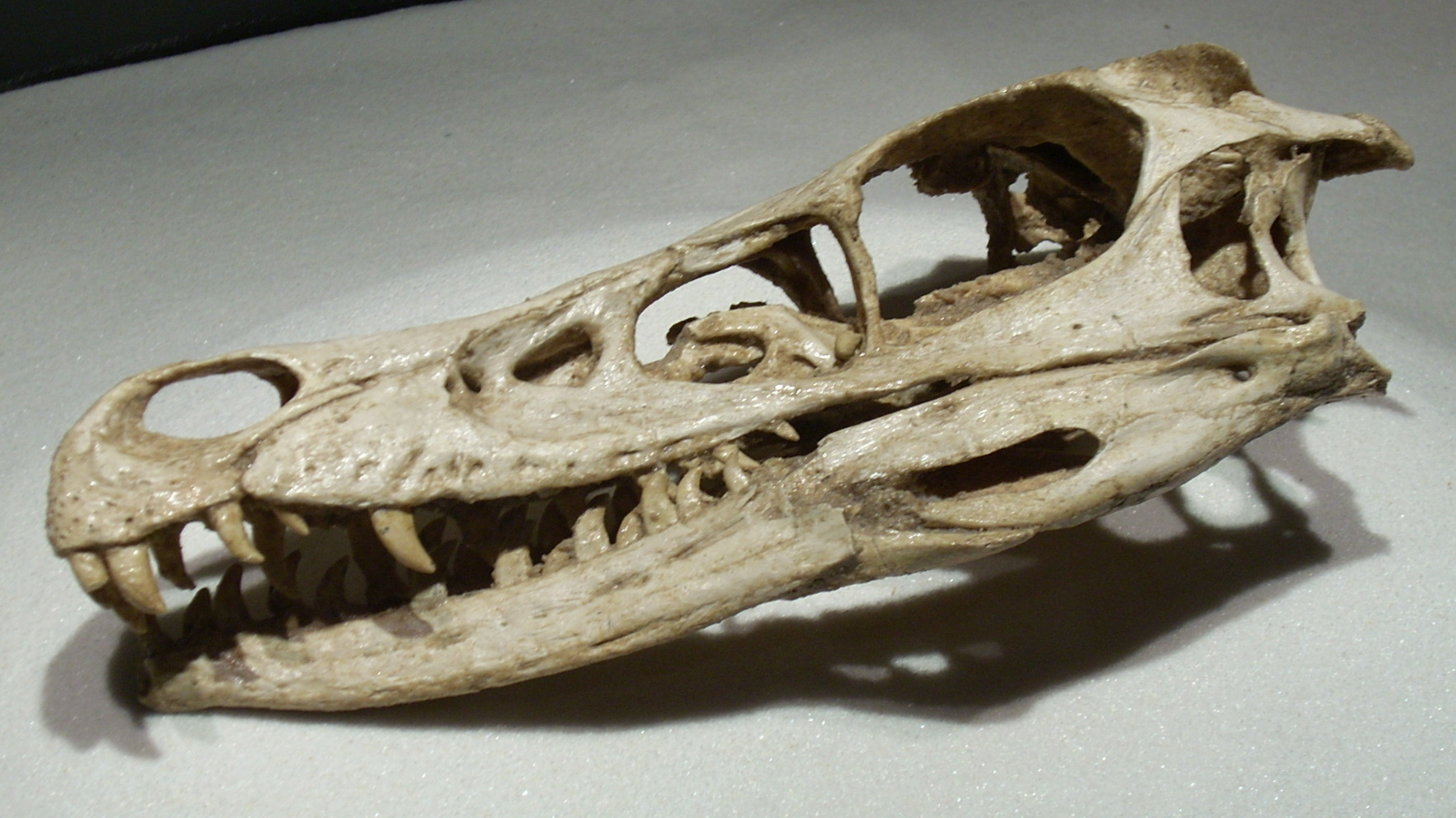
Velociraptor mongoliensis (MPC-D 100/54)

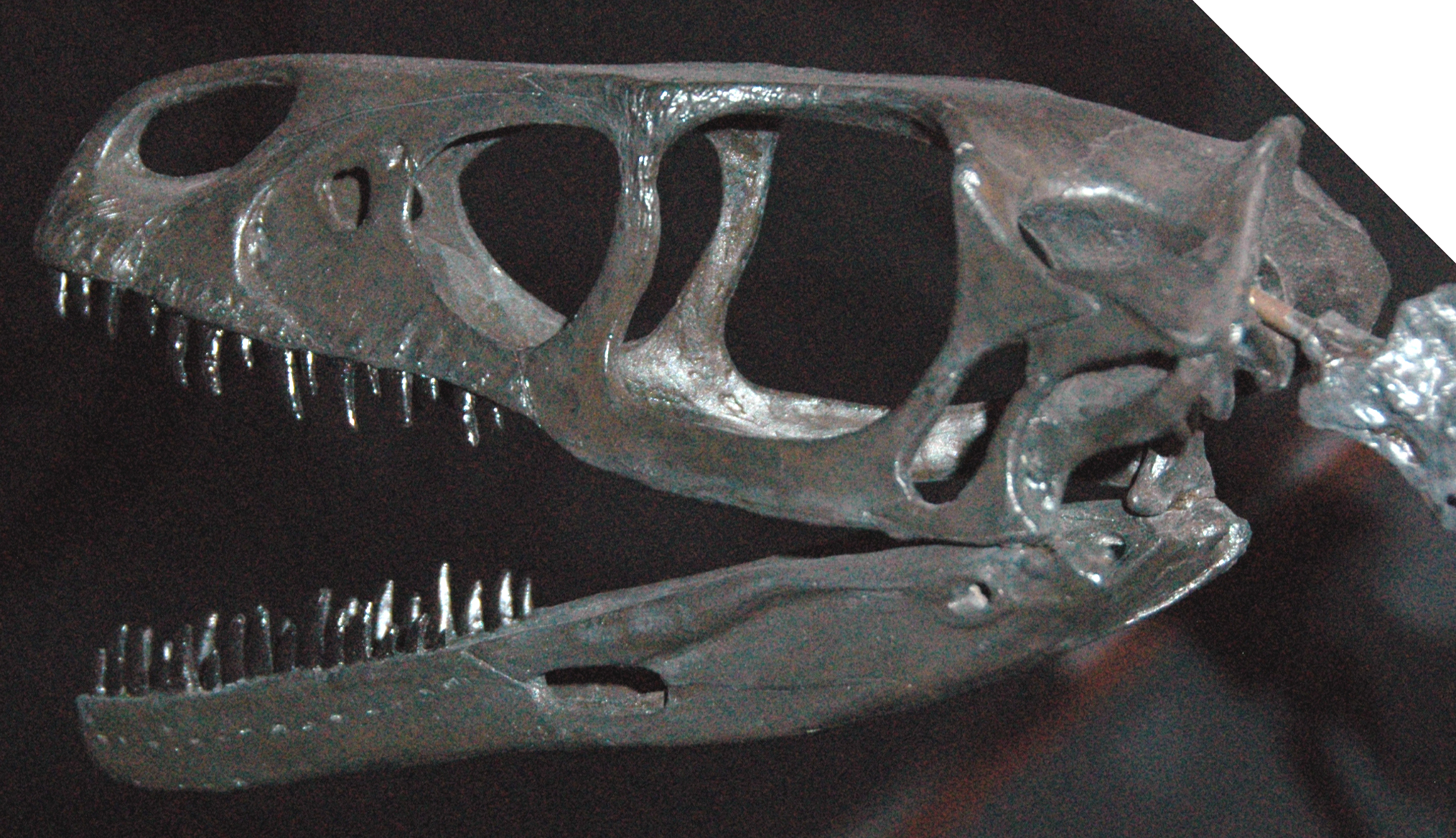
Saurornitholestes langstoni (MOR 660R)

Eudromaeosauria is divided into three major subgroups. The composition of these groups is not universally agreed upon, but there is consensus on the classification of a few key taxa. Most phylogenetic analyses recover these three groups with varying members and varying degrees of confidence.

According to Alan Turner and colleagues in 2012, technical diagnoses for the first subfamily of eudromaeosaurs, the Dromaeosaurinae, can be established based on several synapomorphies. These include fully serrated teeth; vertically oriented pubis; pubic boot (or end) projecting anteriorly and posteriorly; the jugal process of the maxilla, in a ventral view to the external antorbital fenestra, is dorsoventrally wide. This subfamily includes the eponymous Dromaeosaurus and all of its closest relatives.

When erected by Rinchen Barsbold in 1983, the second subfamily of eudromaeosaurs — Velociraptorinae — was conceived as a group containing Velociraptor and supposed closely related species. It was not until 1998 that this group was defined as a clade by Paul Sereno. Sereno defined the group as all dromaeosaurids more closely related to Velociraptor than to Dromaeosaurus. While several studies have since recovered a group of dromaeosaurids closely related to Velociraptor, they vary widely regarding which species are actually velociraptorines and which are either more basal or closer to Dromaeosaurus.

In 2005, Fernando Novas and Diego Pol found a distinct velociraptorine clade close to the traditional view, which included Velociraptor, Deinonychus, and material that was later named Tsaagan. The analysis conducted by Turner and colleagues also supported a traditional, monophyletic of Velociraptorinae. However, some studies found a very different group of dromaeosaurids in velociraptorinae, such as Longrich and Currie (2009), which found Deinonychus to be a non-velociraptorine, non-dromaeosaurine eudromaeosaur, and Saurornitholestes to be a member of a more basal group they named Saurornitholestinae. A larger analysis in 2013 found some traditional velociraptorines, such as Tsaagan, to be more basal than Velociraptor, while others to be more closely related to Dromaeosaurus, making them dromaeosaurines. This study found Balaur, previously found to be a velociraptorine by most analyses, to be an avialan instead.

Saurornitholestinae is the third, and most recently named, subfamily of Eudromaeosauria, erected by Nick Longrich and Philip Currie in 2009. The saurornitholestines are generally found to include three genera: Atrociraptor, Bambiraptor, and Saurornitholestes. All are medium-sized dromaeosaurs from the Late Cretaceous of western North America. The group was originally recognized by Longrich and Currie as the sister taxon to a clade formed by the Dromaeosaurinae and Velociraptorinae. However, not all phylogenetic analyses recover this group with the same proposed genera.

Occasionally, phylogenetic analyses will produce results that do not conform to the traditional topology that includes only three sub-clades. In their description of Acheroraptor in 2013, Evans and colleagues recovered the genera Atrociraptor and Deinonychus in a clade more derived than Saurornitholestinae, but more basal than either Dromaeosaurinae or Velociraptorinae. In the 2020 description of Dineobellator, Jasinski and colleagues recovered the genera Utahraptor, Achillobator, and Adasaurus in a clade that was the sister-taxon of Velociraptorinae. The previous year, Hartman and colleagues recovered a similar clade including Deinonychus, Achillobator, Utahraptor, and Yixianosaurus, which was found to be more basal than any of the three traditional subfamilies. None of these aberrant clades have received consistent support from subsequent analyses.

Additionally, in some analyses, one or more of the subfamilies are recovered as containing only their eponymous genus. Under these results, the subfamily is functionally indistinguishable from the genus.

=== Taxonomic uncertainty ===
The precise nature of the relationship between the three main subgroups of eudromaeosaurs is not known with confidence. Saurornitholestines are sometimes regarded as the most early-diverging eudromaeosaurs, while others find them to be closely related to dromaeosaurines. Several analyses have recovered incongruent results. Below is a summary of the three possible classification schemes based on the findings of different analyses.

Powers et al. (2021)

- Eudrom.
  - Dromaeosaurinae
  - - Saurornitholestinae
    - Velociraptorinae

Jasinski et al. (2022)

- Eudrom.
  - Saurornitholestinae
  - - Dromaeosaurinae
    - Velociraptorinae

Wang & Pei (2024)

- Eudrom.
  - Velociraptorinae
  - - Dromaeosaurinae
    - Saurornitholestinae

The internal composition of the three eudromaeosaur subfamilies is even more contentious than the relationships between the subfamilies themselves. Multiple different competing phylogenetic matrices have been proposed in the literature under various methodological frameworks. Besides the TWiG Matrix (mentioned above) there is the matrix compiled by Mark Powers, the one compiled by Scott Hartman and colleagues, Jonah Choiniere's matrix, Lindsay Zanno's matrix, Andrea Cau's matrix, and the matrix published by Philip Currie and David Evans. Some researchers have combined one or more of these matrices to produce additional novel results. The list below includes a summary of the possible classifications for each dromaeosaur genus that have been thus far suggested by various researchers.

Possible affinities of eudromaeosaur genera
Unambiguous eudromaeosaurs
| Genus | Suggested classifications |
|---|---|
| Acheroraptor | Originally described as a velociraptorine, subsequently recovered as a saurornitholestine, |
| Achillobator | Generally believed to be a dromaeosaurine, has been recovered as being closely related to, but outside of, velociraptorines |
| Adasaurus | Originally described as a dromaeosaurine, generally believed to be a velociraptorine, but has alternatively been found as a saurornitholestine or as a basal member of eudromaeosauria |
| Atrociraptor | Originally described as a velociraptorine, but typically considered a saurornitholestine, |
| Bambiraptor | Either a saurornitholestine, a junior synonym of Saurornitholestes, or a basal member of eudromaeosauria, |
| Boreonykus | Originally described as a velociraptorine, has also been recovered as a dromaeosaurine |
| Deinonychus | Variously found as a dromaeosaurine, a velociraptorine, a saurornitholestine, or being outside of all three groups |
| Dineobellator | Originally described as a velociraptorine, which has been supported, may be outside of all three major subfamilies |
| Dromaeosaurus | Must belong to Dromaeosaurinae by definition |
| Itemirus | Originally assigned to its own family ("Itemiridae") outside of dromaeosauridae, later recovered as a dromaeosaurine or possibly a velociraptorine |
| Kansaignathus | Early-diverging velociraptorine |
| Kuru | Generally accepted to be a velociraptorine |
| Linheraptor | Originally described as a basal eudromaeosaur closely related to Tsaagan, has also been recovered as a velociraptorine and a dromaeosaurine |
| Luanchuanraptor | Described as a velociraptorine, has been suggested to be a dromaeosaurine |
| Saurornitholestes | Must belong to Saurornitholestinae by definition |
| Shri | Generally accepted to be a velociraptorine |
| Tsaagan | Originally described as a velociraptorine, which has been supported by subsequent analyses, has also been recovered as a dromaeosaurine; generally agreed to be a close relative of Linheraptor |
| Utahraptor | Generally believed to be a dromaeosaurine, has been suggested to be a velociraptorine, a saurornitholestine, or to be outside all three subfamilies |
| Velociraptor | Must belong to Velociraptorinae by definition |
| Yurgovuchia | Originally described as a dromaeosaurine, may be a basal eudromaeosaur or a velociraptorine |
Possible eudromaeosaurs
| Genus | Suggested classifications |
| Balaur | Described as a velociraptorine, has been recovered as a dromaeosaurine, may be a stem-avialan, |
| Dakotaraptor | Believed by some to be a chimera, originally described as a dromaeosaurine, subsequently found as a possible unenlagiine |
| Dromaeosauroides | Potentially dubious genus, only known from teeth, originally described as a dromaeosaurine, subsequently recovered as an indeterminate dromaeosaurid |
| Hesperonychus | Originally described as a microraptorian, but may be an avialan, a eudromaeosaur, or some other kind of dromaeosaurid |
| Nuthetes | Potentially dubious genus, only known from teeth, may or may not be a velociraptorine, suggested to be a tyrannosauroid |
| Ornithodesmus | Potentially dubious genus, may be an unenlagiine or a eudromaeosaur |
| Phaedrolosaurus | Nomen dubium; based on an isolated tooth, may be a dromaeosaurine or an indeterminate eudromaeosaur, based on similarities in the tooth to other dromaeosaurs, such as Deinonychus |
| Pyroraptor | May be a dromaeosaurine or an indeterminate eudromaeosaur, has been recovered as an unenlagiine |
| Tianyuraptor | Generally believed to be a microraptorian, sometimes recovered as a eudromaeosaur, an unenlagiine, or belonging to an unnamed clade closely related to eudromaeosaurs |
| Variraptor | May be a dromaeosaurine, an indeterminate eudromaeosaur, an unenlagiine, or a microraptorian |
| Vectiraptor | Tentatively described as a eudromaeosaur |
| Yixianosaurus | Originally described as an indeterminate maniraptoran, but has since been recovered as an anchiornithid, a scansoriopterygid, as a basal eudromaeosaur, a saurornitholestine, or some other kind of stem-paravian |
| Zapsalis | Potentially dubious genus, only known from teeth, possible junior synonym of Saurornitholestes |

== Evolutionary history and paleobiogeography ==
=== Evolutionary origin ===
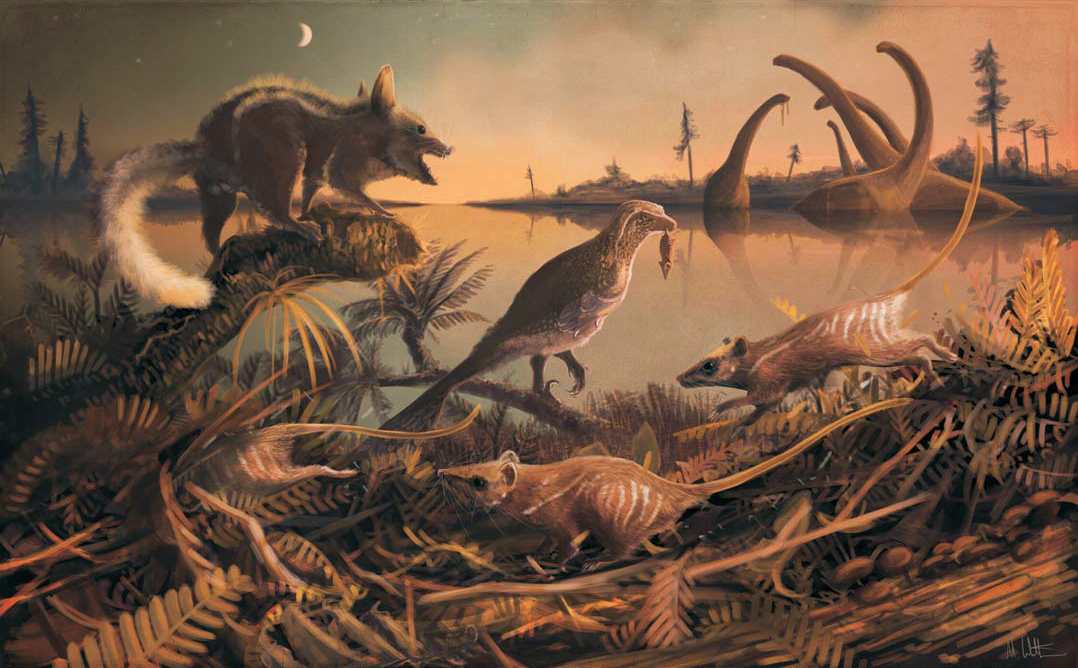
Nuthetes (center), which is the most ancient eudromaeosaur to be named thus far

Dromaeosaurids presumably originated in the Middle Jurassic, along with their relatives the troodontids and avialans. This is inferred from their phylogeny, but no dromaeosaur fossils have yet been discovered from this timeframe. This has been interpreted as a taphonomic bias resulting from the relatively fragile skeletons of the earliest dromaeosaurs. Eudromaeosaurs, as derived members of Dromaeosauridae, likely evolved slightly later in the Jurassic Period, or possibly even at the beginning of the Cretaceous.

Evidence of their presence, pending the eventual discovery of body fossils, is limited to fossilized teeth. These teeth, which may or may not be attributable to velociraptorine eudromaeosaurs were discovered in the Langenberg Quarry in Lower Saxony, Germany, which is estimated to be Kimmeridgian in age. Teeth of a similar morphology have also been discovered from the roughly contemporaneous Alcobaça Formation of Portugal. If these teeth belong to eudromaeosaurs, then they may suggest a European origin of the group. Isolated teeth that may belong to eudromaeosaurs have also been discovered in Ethiopia. These teeth date to the Tithonian stage, of the Late Jurassic period. What implications this may have for the evolutionary history of the group are not clear.

The next fossil evidence of eudromaeosaurs possibly comes from the beginning of the Early Cretaceous. Teeth from the Berriasian-aged Lulworth Formation of England were found and named "Megalosaurus destructor" in the 19th-century. These teeth have since been reassigned to the genus Nuthetes, which has been suggested to be a eudromaeosaur. However, this is not universally accepted, and some researchers have suggested that these teeth belong to tyrannosauroids. The similarly aged Jydegaard Formation of Denmark has also yielded the tooth taxon Dromaeosauroides, which may have been a dromaeosaurine eudromaeosaur, although some authors consider it to be dubious or an indeterminate dromaeosaurid.

The earliest definitive eudromaeosaurs are known from the Valanginian-aged Yellow Cat Member of the Cedar Mountain Formation in Utah. These genera, Utahraptor and Yurgovuchia, are typically assigned to dromaeosaurinae, and may suggest a North American origin of dromaeosaurines, or even eudromaeosaurs as a whole. Alternatively, some taxa from the Cedar Mountain Formation have been suggested to descend from Asian ancestors which migrated to North America via Beringia.

=== Diversification and dispersal ===
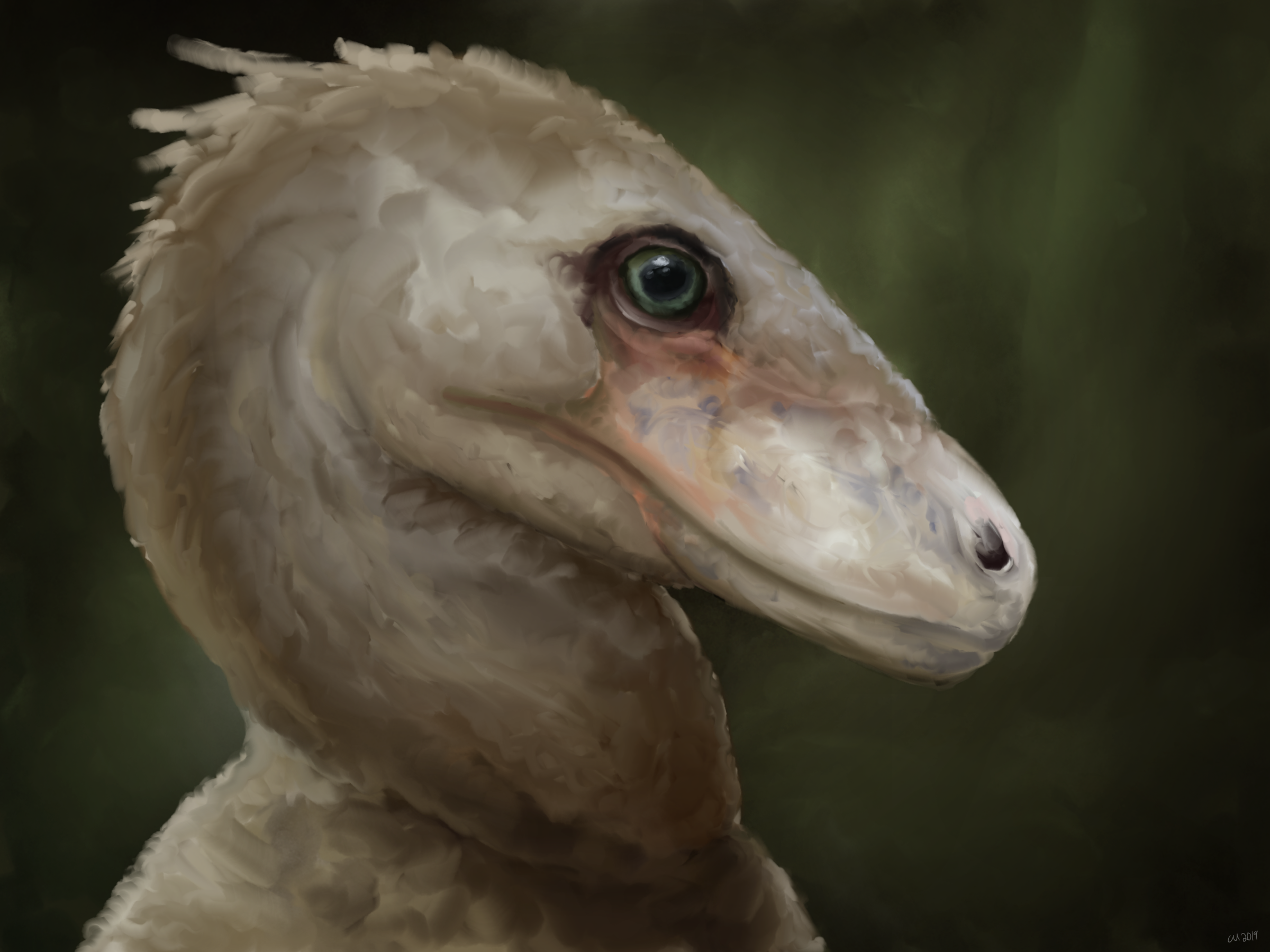
Itemirus from the Turonian of Uzbekistan

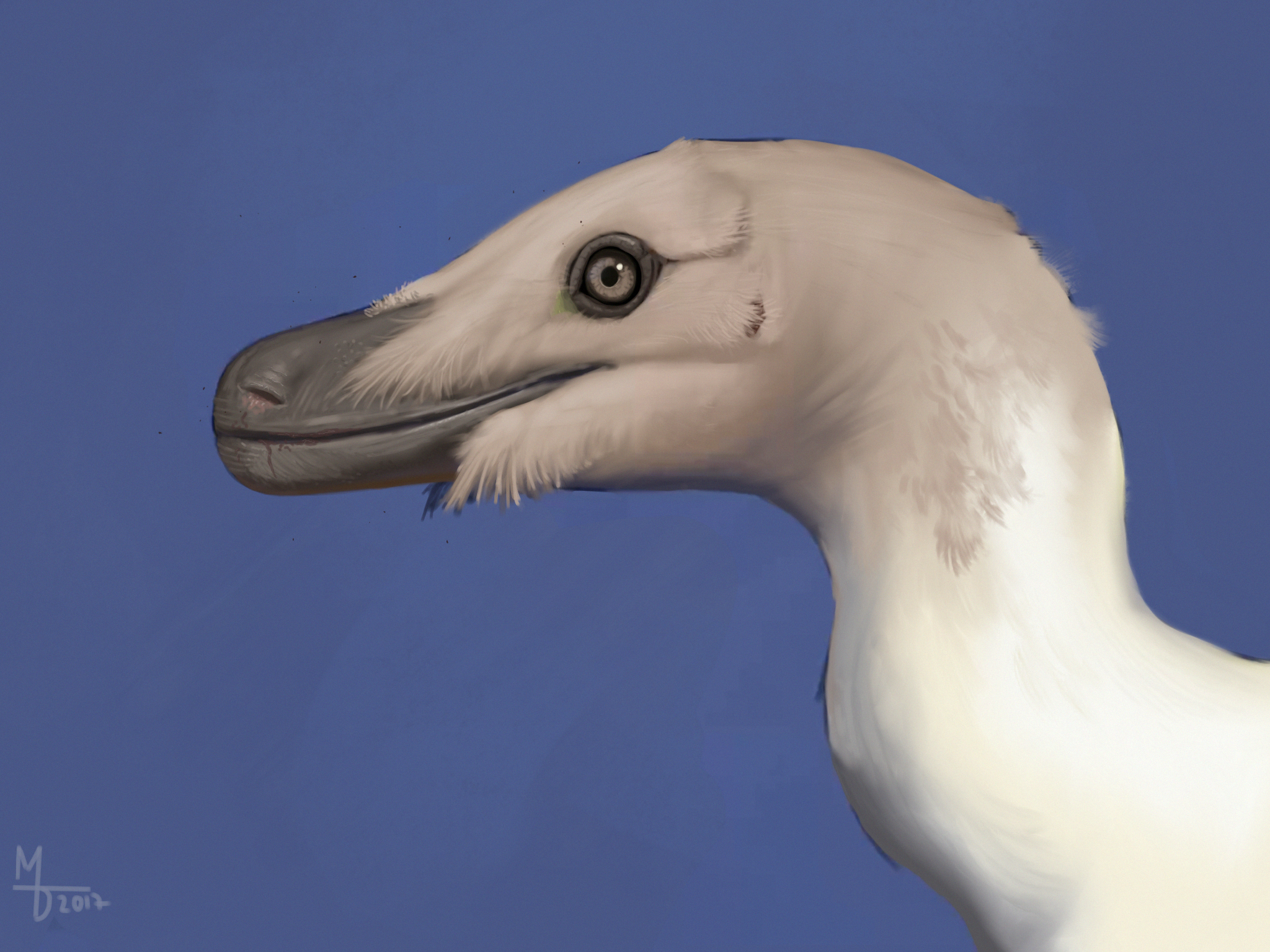
Velociraptor from the Campanian of Mongolia

The suggested Late Jurassic or Early Cretaceous origin of eudromaeosaurs is consistent with the fossil record because known eudromaeosaur fossils have a much narrower geographic distribution than Dromaeosauridae as a whole. Eudromaeosaurs are so-far only known from the Northern Hemisphere, whereas dromaeosaurids as a whole had a cosmopolitan distribution. This distribution suggests that eudroameosaurs evolved after Pangaea split into Laurasia and Gondwana, and they were therefore unable to colonize the Southern Hemisphere.

There is a large gap in the general richness of terrestrial fossils in North America during the middle of the Cretaceous Period. The only eudromaeosaur genus from the Albian or Aptian (a roughly 20 million-year-long period) is Deinonychus, which is known from the Antlers, Cloverly, and Cedar Mountain formations throughout the western United States. At some point during this gap in the fossil record, eudromaeosaurs dispersed from their ancestral home in either Europe or North America and colonized Asia. Cenomanian and Turonian deposits have yielded several eudromaeosaurs of varying affinities including Achillobator, Itemirus, and a large unnamed taxon from the Bissekty Formation.

Several dromaeosaurines are known from the early and middle Cretaceous, before any unambiguous velociraptorines or saurornitholestines are known. Mark Powers and colleagues, in their 2021 analysis of CT scans of dromaeosaur skulls, suggested that dromaeosaurines first evolved in North America before spreading to Asia. Under their analytical framework, the common ancestor of velociraptorines and saurornitholestines dispersed in a similar manner. The geographic separation between the two populations suggests that the two clades are endemic to Asia and North America and evolved via allopatry.

Velociraptorines appear for the first time in the Santonian of Kyrgyzstan (unless Deinonychus is a velociraptorine) with the taxon Kansaignathus from the Yalovach Formation. The bulk of known velociraptorine diversity would thereafter be found in Asia, and it would include the famous Velociraptor as well as taxa like Tsaagan, Kuru, and Adasaurus. Some North American taxa (Acheroraptor and Dineobellator) have also been suggested to be velociraptorines, which would indicate a more complex pattern of dispersal for this clade.

Eudromaeosaurs may have also colonized Europe during the Cretaceous. The taxa Balaur, Variraptor, and Pyroraptor have all been suggested to be eudromaeosaurs, and they are each known from the Late Cretaceous of Europe. North America appears to have been the only continent on which saurornitholestines lived. Unambiguous members of this group are only known from the Campanian and Maastrichtian of western North America. Dromaeosaur teeth are also known from the Late Cretaceous of Appalachia, although it is not known if these animals arrived before or after the Western Interior Seaway split Appalachia from Laramidia.

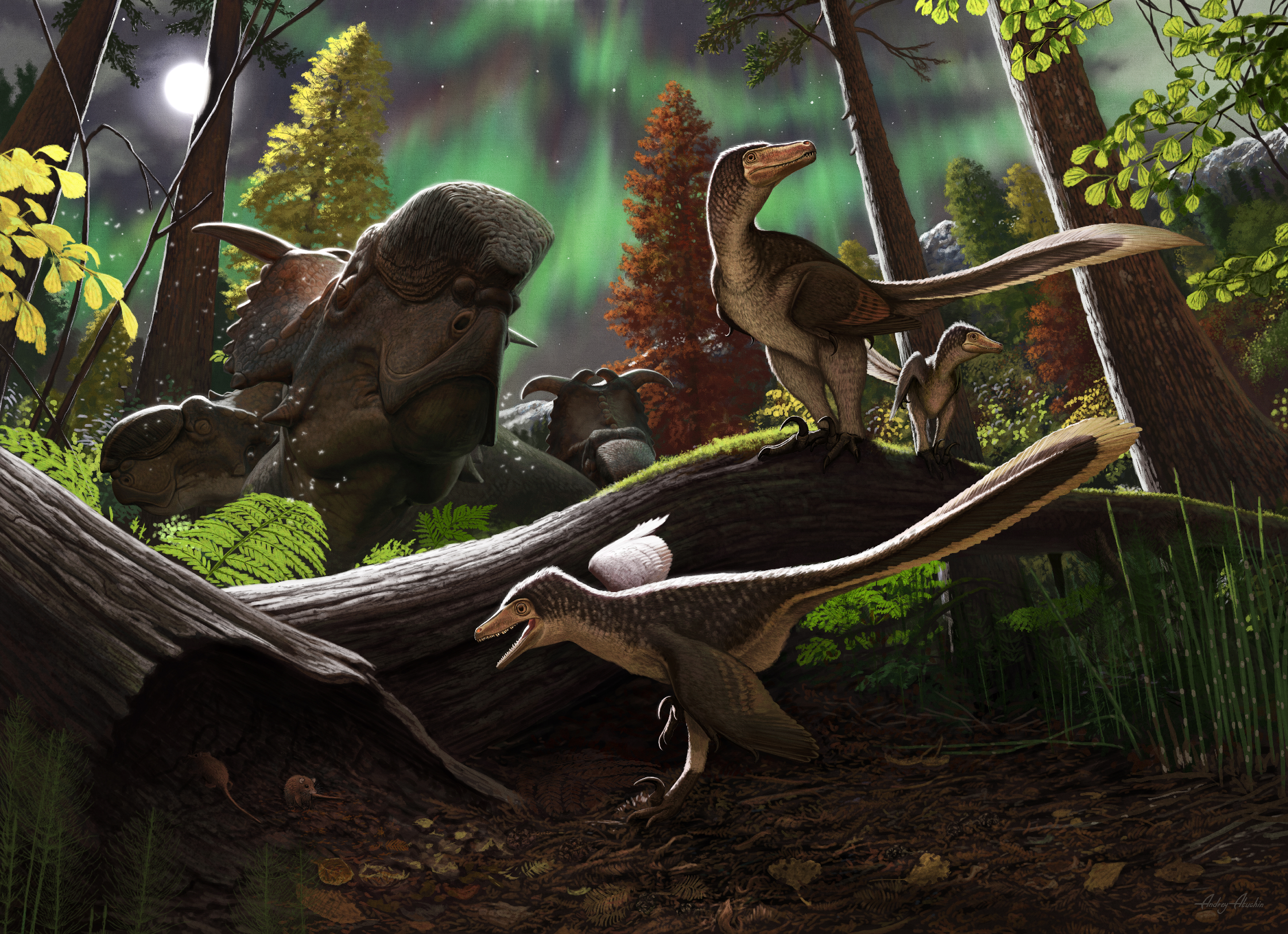
An unnamed saurornitholestine from the Maastrichtian of Alaska alongside the contemporary Pachyrhinosaurus

The pattern the evolution of the three major subfamilies is also controversial among scientists. Some researchers have suggested that saurornitholestines are the earliest-diverging members of this group. If that is the case, it suggests a North American origin for Eudromaeosauria. However, if saurornitholestines are more closely related to velociraptorines, then they may have immigrated to North America from Asia closer to the end of the Cretaceous.

A 2020 study by Alfio Alessandro Chiarenza and colleagues examined the fragmentary remains of a dromaeosaurid jaw from the Prince Creek Formation of Alaska and found this specimen (DMNH 21183) to be a member of Saurornitholestinae. North America and Asia may have been connected via the Bering land bridge at this time, and the existence of saurornitholestines so far north suggests they may have been capable of moving between the two continents. The authors remarked that the early Maastrichtian age of this specimen suggests that a dispersal event could have taken place around that time. During this hypothetical dispersal event, velociraptorines from Asia and saurornitholestines from North America may have migrated across the land bridge so that both groups may have been present on both continents. This hypothesis is consistent with the suggestion that several North American dromaeosaurs (particularly Acheroraptor and Dineobellator) may be members of Velociraptorinae, although this is not universally agreed upon by researchers.

The biogeographical implications of eudromaeosaur phylogeny were also explored in a 2021 paper by Mark Powers and colleagues. They hypothesized that eudromaeosaurs first evolved in Asia before later dispersing to North America, which possibly coincided with a similar dispersal of microraptorians. According to this framework, velociraptorines and saurornitholestines evolved from a common ancestor which lived some time during the Early Cretaceous. This common ancestor would have dispersed from North America back to Asia via the land bridge. The population that dispersed to Asia, according to this hypothesis, would eventually evolve into velociraptorines, while the population that remained in North America would become saurornitholestines.

=== Extinction ===
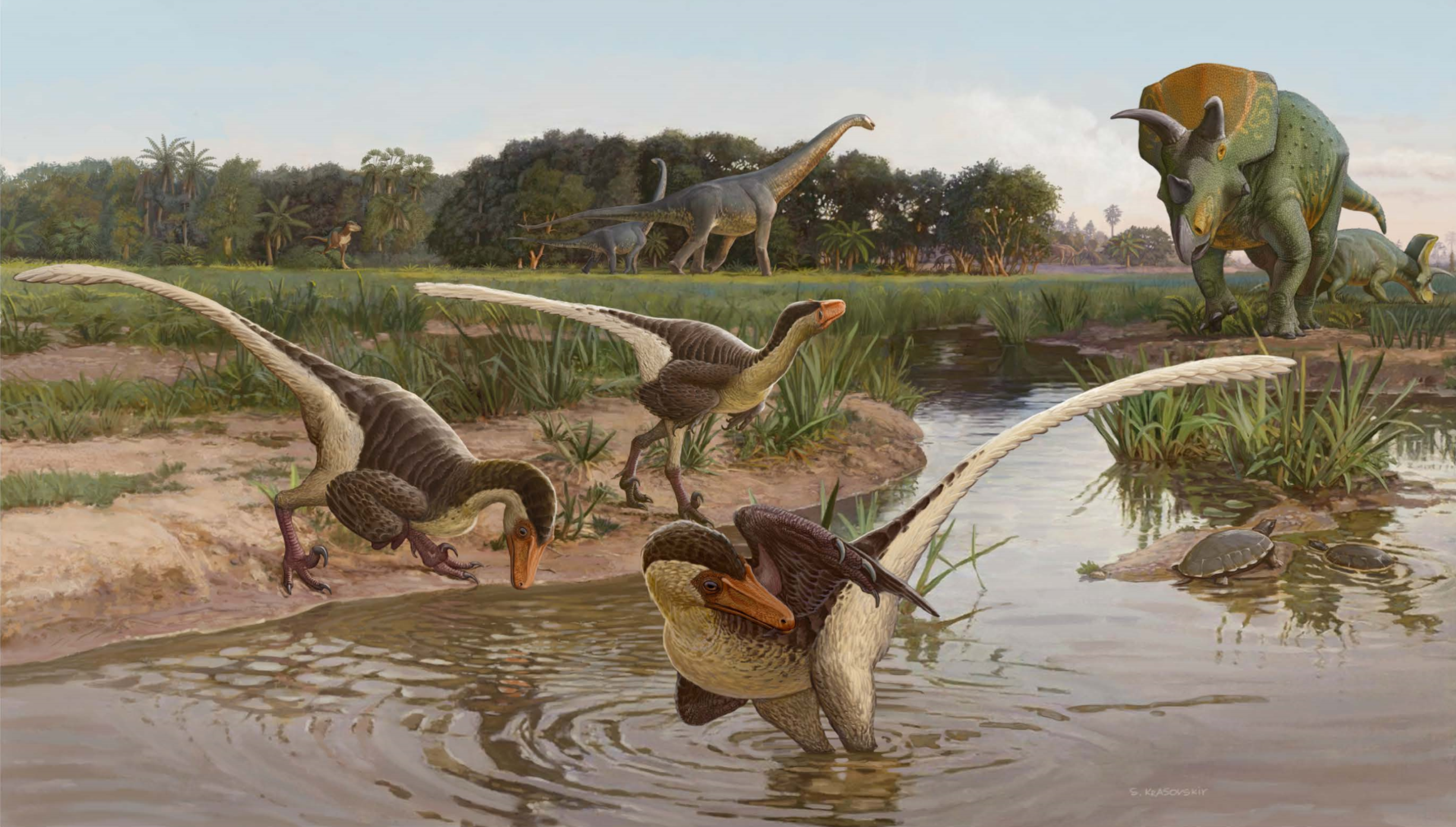
Dineobellator from the Maastrichtian of New Mexico, one of the last surviving eudromaeosaurs

Eudromaeosaurs were among the last of the non-avian dinosaurs to persist until the end of the Cretaceous Period. Most eudromaeosaur genera are known from the Campanian and the Maastrichtian, the two stages at the end of the Cretaceous. Several eudromaeosaurs would have lived to see the asteroid impact at the very end of the Cretaceous which led to their extinction alongside all other non-avian dinosaurs.

Several eudromaeosaurs are known from the Maastrichtian of Laramidia. These included Acheroraptor and the possible chimera Dakotaraptor from the Hell Creek Formation and Dineobellator from the Ojo Alamo Formation. The taxon Luanchuanraptor was discovered in the terminal Qiupa Formation of central China. Indeterminate eudromaeosaur remains have also been found at the Udurchukan, Scollard, and Javelina formations. Other localities dated to the very end of the Cretaceous in South America, Africa, and Antarctica have not yielded eudromaeosaur fossils as of yet.

The exact trajectory of non-avian dinosaur diversity at the end of the Cretaceous is not confidently known. Some researchers have suggested that the diversity of dinosaurs was declining leading up to the Chixulub Impact, but this has been met with resistance by other researchers. The relative rarity of dromaeosaurid remains make it difficult to assess if they were increasing or decreasing in diversity, if either, near the end of the Cretaceous.

It is possible that some individual eudromaeosaurs (or other small non-avian dinosaurs) survived the immediate aftermath of the asteroid impact, but they likely would have been deprived of food. Herbivorous dinosaurs would have found plant material scarce, and carnivores would therefore have quickly found prey in short supply and starved to death. Even if a small number of eudromaeosaurs survived all subsequent environmental disasters and the ecological collapse, any survivors would have likely been too few in number to produce a viable population, resulting in their inevitable extinction.

== See also ==
- Dinosaurs in Jurassic Park
- Dinosaur renaissance
- Timeline of dromaeosaurid research
