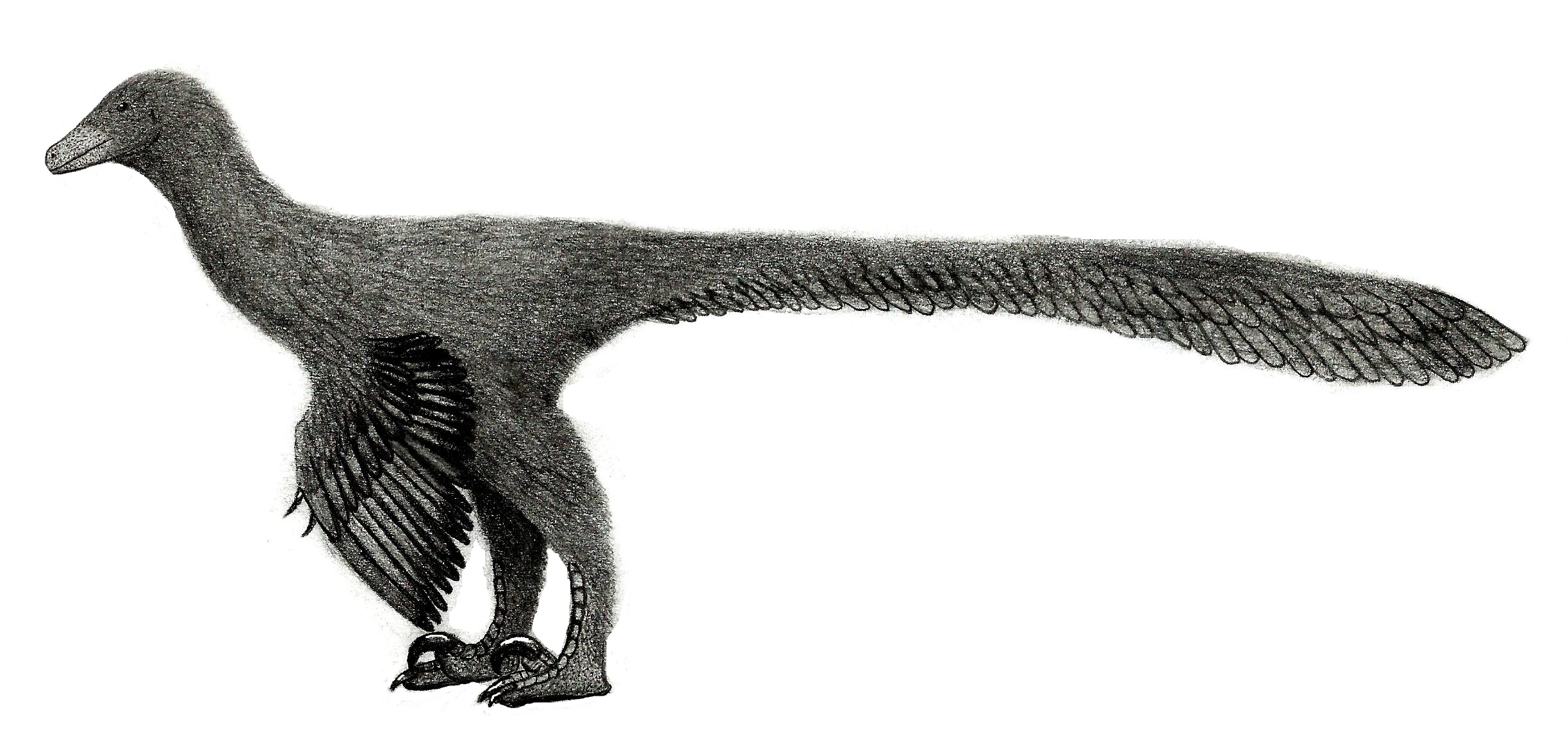
- Restoration

Scientific classification
- Kingdom: Animalia
- Phylum: Chordata
- Class: Reptilia
- Clade: Dinosauria
- Clade: Saurischia
- Clade: Theropoda
- Family: †Dromaeosauridae
- Genus: †Boreonykus; Bell & Currie, 2015

Type species
- †Boreonykus certekorum Bell & Currie, 2015

= Boreonykus =

Boreonykus Temporal range: Late Cretaceous, ~73.27 Ma

Extinct genus of dinosaurs

Boreonykus is an extinct genus of dromaeosaurid dinosaur, that lived during the Late Cretaceous in the area of present Canada.

Fragmentary dromaeosaurid remains were discovered in the 1980s at the Pipestone Creek site in central Alberta during excavations of a bonebed containing twenty-seven individuals of the ceratopsid Pachyrhinosaurus lakustai. They were initially partly referred to a Saurornitholestes sp in 2001.

The type species Boreonykus certekorum was named and described by Phil Bell and Philip John Currie in 2015. The genus name is a variation of "Boreonychus", "northern claw". The specific name certekorum references the Certek company, that works in the oil industry and provided financial support for the excavations.

The holotype specimen of Boreonykus, TMP 1989.055.0047, was found in a layer of the Wapiti Formation in central Alberta, which dates from the late Campanian, 73.27 ± 0.25 million years ago. It consists of a right frontal bone. Fourteen loose teeth have been referred to the species, as well as several postcranial bones, perhaps of the same individual: the specimen TMP 1988.055.0129, a rear caudal vertebra; UALVP 53597, a claw of the second finger, and the specimen TMP 1986.055.0184.1, a sickle claw of the foot.

A single autapomorphy, unique derived trait, was indicated: the ridges bordering the fronts of the depressions around the supratemporal fenestrae form an acute angle of 55° together, pointing to the rear.

Boreonykus was, within the Dromaeosauridae, placed in the Velociraptorinae. It was seen as both an indication of faunal provincialism and a quick species turn-over rate. However, in 2021, Boreonykus was recovered within the Dromaeosaurinae, restricting the distribution of velociraptorines only to Asia.
