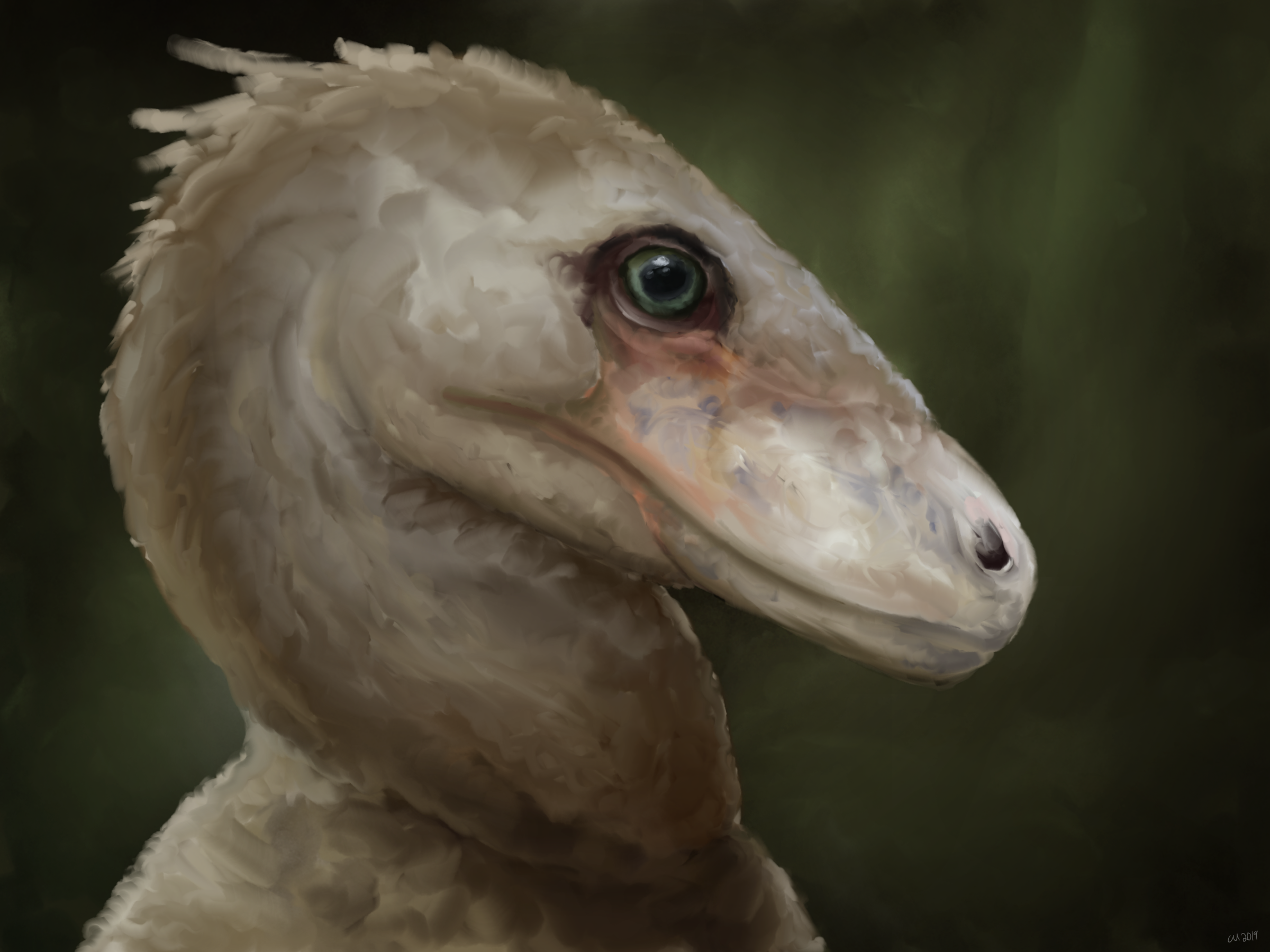
- Reconstruction

Scientific classification
- Kingdom: Animalia
- Phylum: Chordata
- Class: Reptilia
- Clade: Dinosauria
- Clade: Saurischia
- Clade: Theropoda
- Family: †Dromaeosauridae
- Clade: †Eudromaeosauria
- Subfamily: †Dromaeosaurinae
- Genus: †Itemirus; Kurzanov, 1976
- Species: †I. medullaris

Binomial name
- †Itemirus medullaris Kurzanov, 1976

= Itemirus =

Itemirus Temporal range: Turonian, 91 Ma

Extinct genus of dinosaurs

Itemirus is a genus of dromaeosaurid theropod dinosaur from the Turonian aged Bissekty Formation of the Late Cretaceous period of Uzbekistan.

== Discovery ==
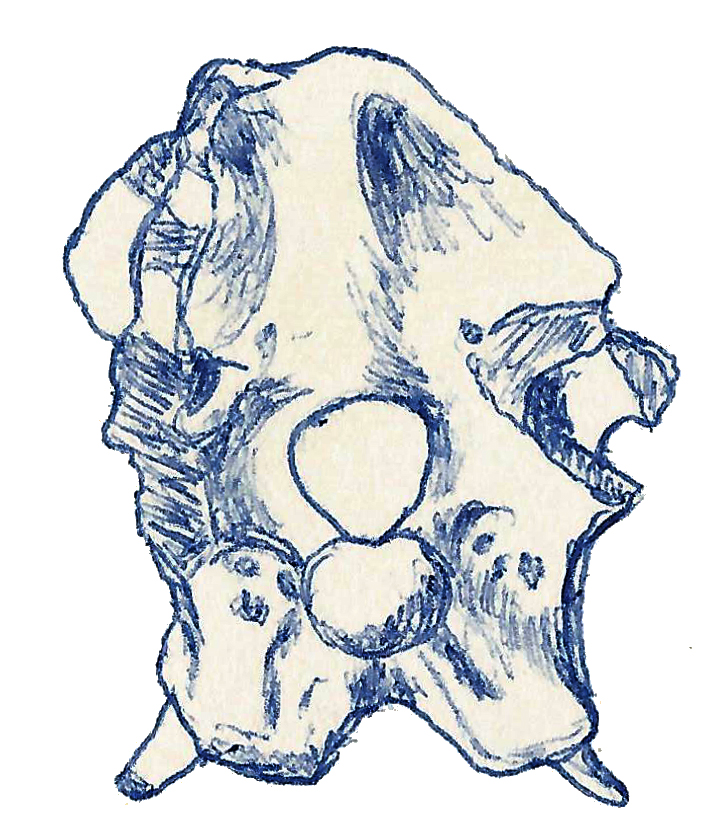
Rear of skull

Itemirus is known from a single small, damaged fossil braincase or neurocranium, in 1958 found near the village of Itemir at the Dzharakuduk escarpment in layers of the Bissekty Formation. This holotype has accession number PIN 327/699. The type species, Itemirus medullaris, was named and described by Sergei Kurzanov in 1976. The generic name refers to Itemir. The specific name refers to the medulla oblongata, the part of the brain encased by the partial braincase.

== Classification ==
Kurzanov noted anatomical similarities to the Tyrannosauridae and the Dromaeosauridae; he assigned Itemirus to a separate Itemiridae. In 2004, Thomas Holtz suggested it was a member of the Tyrannosauroidea. Nicholas Longrich and Philip J. Currie in 2009 included Itemirus in a cladistic analysis of internal dromaeosaurid relationships and found it to be a velociraptorine. In 2014, during a study assigning more material to Itemirus, it was found that the genus could be placed in Dromaeosaurinae in a phylogeny.

- Eudromaeosauria
  - Bambiraptor
  - - Saurornitholestes
    - Velociraptorinae
      - Deinonychus
      - - Adasaurus
        - - Velociraptor
          - Balaur
    - Dromaeosaurinae
      - Tsaagan
      - - Dromaeosaurus
        - Atrociraptor
        - Utahraptor
        - Achillobator
        - Itemirus

== See also ==
- Timeline of dromaeosaurid research
