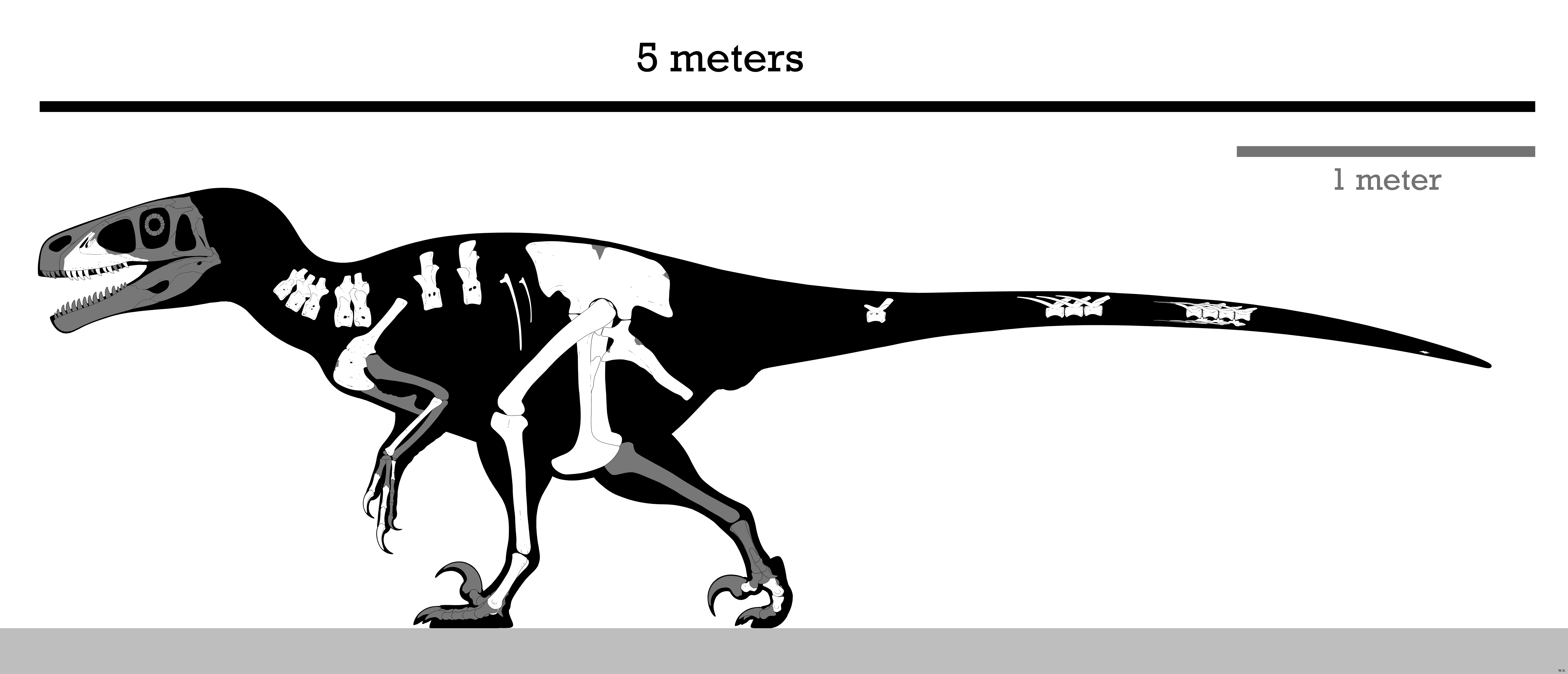
- Skeletal diagram showing the size and preserved elements from holotype

Scientific classification
- Kingdom: Animalia
- Phylum: Chordata
- Class: Reptilia
- Clade: Dinosauria
- Clade: Saurischia
- Clade: Theropoda
- Family: †Dromaeosauridae
- Clade: †Eudromaeosauria
- Subfamily: †Dromaeosaurinae
- Genus: †Achillobator; Perle et al. 1999

Type species
- †Achillobator giganticus Perle et al. 1999

= Achillobator =

Achillobator Temporal range: Late Cretaceous (Cenomanian to Coniacian) ~96–89 Ma

Extinct dromaeosaurid genus from the Late Cretaceous period

Achillobator (/əˌkɪləˈbeɪtɔːr/ ə-KIL-ə-BAY-tor; meaning "Achilles hero") is a genus of large dromaeosaurid theropod dinosaur that lived during the Late Cretaceous period about 96 million to 89 million years ago in what is now the Bayan Shireh Formation of Mongolia. The genus is currently monotypic, only including the type species A. giganticus. The first remains were found in 1989 during a Mongolian-Russian field expedition and later described in 1999. Remains at the type locality of Achillobator may represent additional specimens. It represents the first and largest dromaeosaurid known from the Bayan Shireh Formation.

It was a large, heavily-built, ground-dwelling, bipedal carnivore that would have been an active feathered predator hunting with the enlarged sickle claw on each second toe. Measuring around 4.5–5 m (15–16 ft) long and weighing between 250–300 kg (550–660 lb), Achillobator is considered to be one of the largest dromaeosaurs, along with Austroraptor and Utahraptor. Achillobator was a deep-bodied and relatively short-armed dromaeosaurid with stocky and robust legs. Some of the most notable features consisted in the robustly built skeleton—an unusual trait in dromaeosaur dinosaurs, which were generally lightly built animals—such as the deep maxilla and femur, along with the primitive pelvis, having a vertically oriented pubis that differs from most other dromaeosaurids.

Achillobator is classified as a dromaeosaurid taxon, more specifically within Eudromaeosauria, a group of hypercarnivorous dromaeosaurids that were mainly terrestrial instead of arboreal or amphibious. In most cladistic analyses, Achillobator is recovered as a close relative of Dromaeosaurus and Utahraptor, although it is often considered to be the sister taxon of the latter. The stocky and short leg ratio of Achillobator indicates that it was not cursorial—an animal adapted for high speed or to maintain said high speeds. Moreover, the robust morphology of the maxilla suggests a predatory behavior based around hunting large prey.

== History of discovery ==
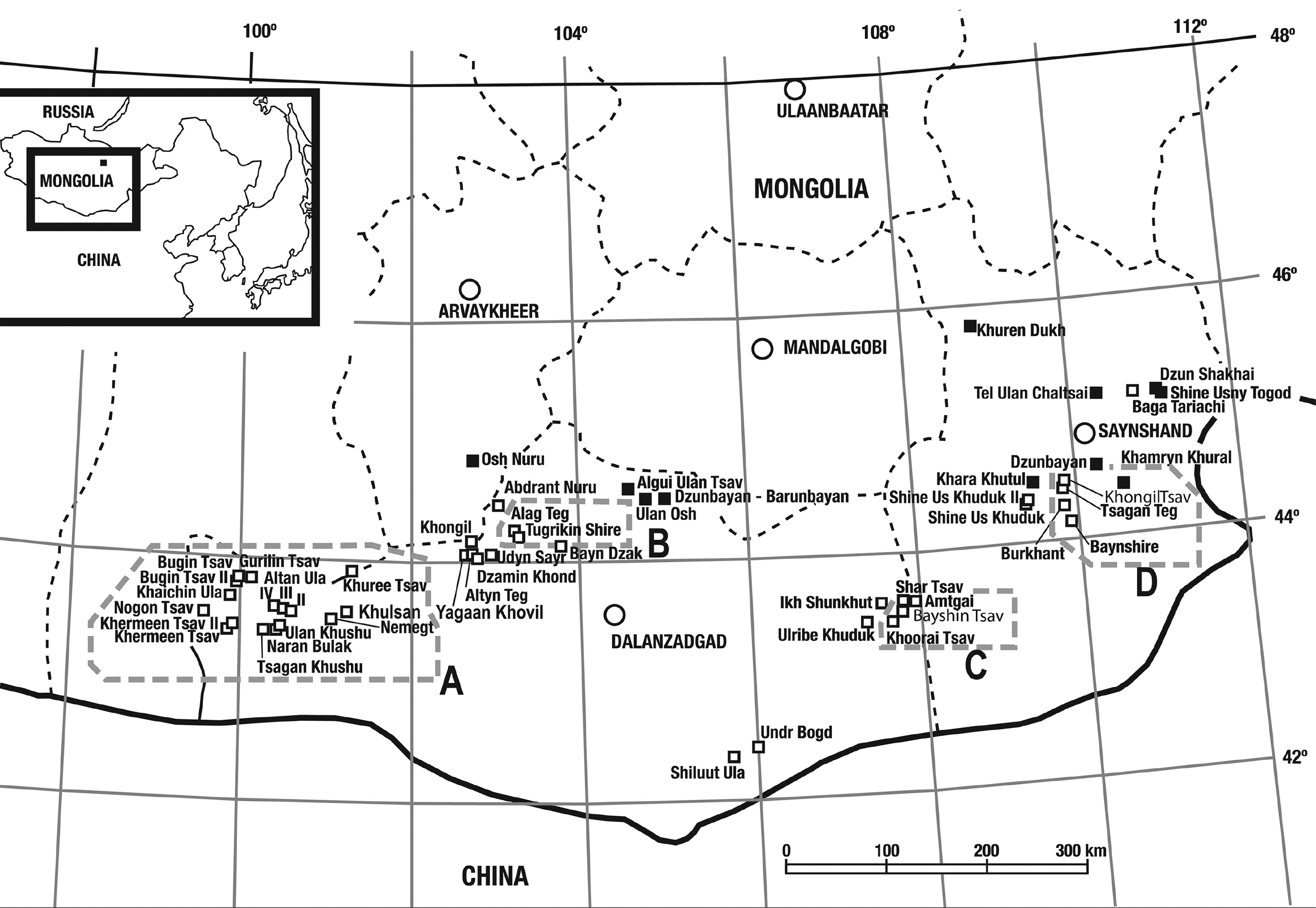
Fossil localities in Mongolia. Achillobator fossils have been collected at Burkhant (area D)

During a field exploration examining the outcrops at the Khongil locality in South Central Mongolia in 1989, conducted by the Mongolian and Russian Paleontological Expedition in the Gobi Desert, many dinosaur fossil discoveries were made. About 5.6 km (5,600 m) away from this locality, a large and associated, but mostly disarticulated partial theropod skeleton was discovered in sediments of the Burkhant locality, Bayan Shireh Formation. No other findings were made by the expedition at this locality. It was found in fine-grained, medium sandstone/gray mudstone that was deposited dating back to the Late Cretaceous. The specimen was found preserving a left maxilla with nine teeth and two empty alveoli, four cervical vertebrae, three dorsal vertebrae, eight caudal vertebrae, a nearly complete pelvic girdle compromising both pubes, the right ilium, the right ischium, both femora, the left tibia, left metatarsals III and IV, manual and pedal phalanges with some unguals, the right scapulocoracoid, an isolated radius, two ribs, and caudal chevrons. It was collected and prepared by the assistant paleontologist, Namsarai Batulseen, and stored as MNUFR-15. Ten years later, the specimen was formally described in 1999 and became the holotype for the new genus and species Achillobator giganticus. It was identified as a dromaeosaurid taxon. The description was performed by Mongolian paleontologist Altangerel Perle and North American paleontologists Mark A. Norell and James M. Clark. In terms of etymology, the generic name, Achillobator, is derived from the Latin word "Achillis" (genitive singular of Achilles), in reference to the large Achilles tendon that supported the second pedal ungual (known as the "sickle claw") of most dromaeosaurids, and the old Mongolian word "баатар" (baatar, meaning hero).

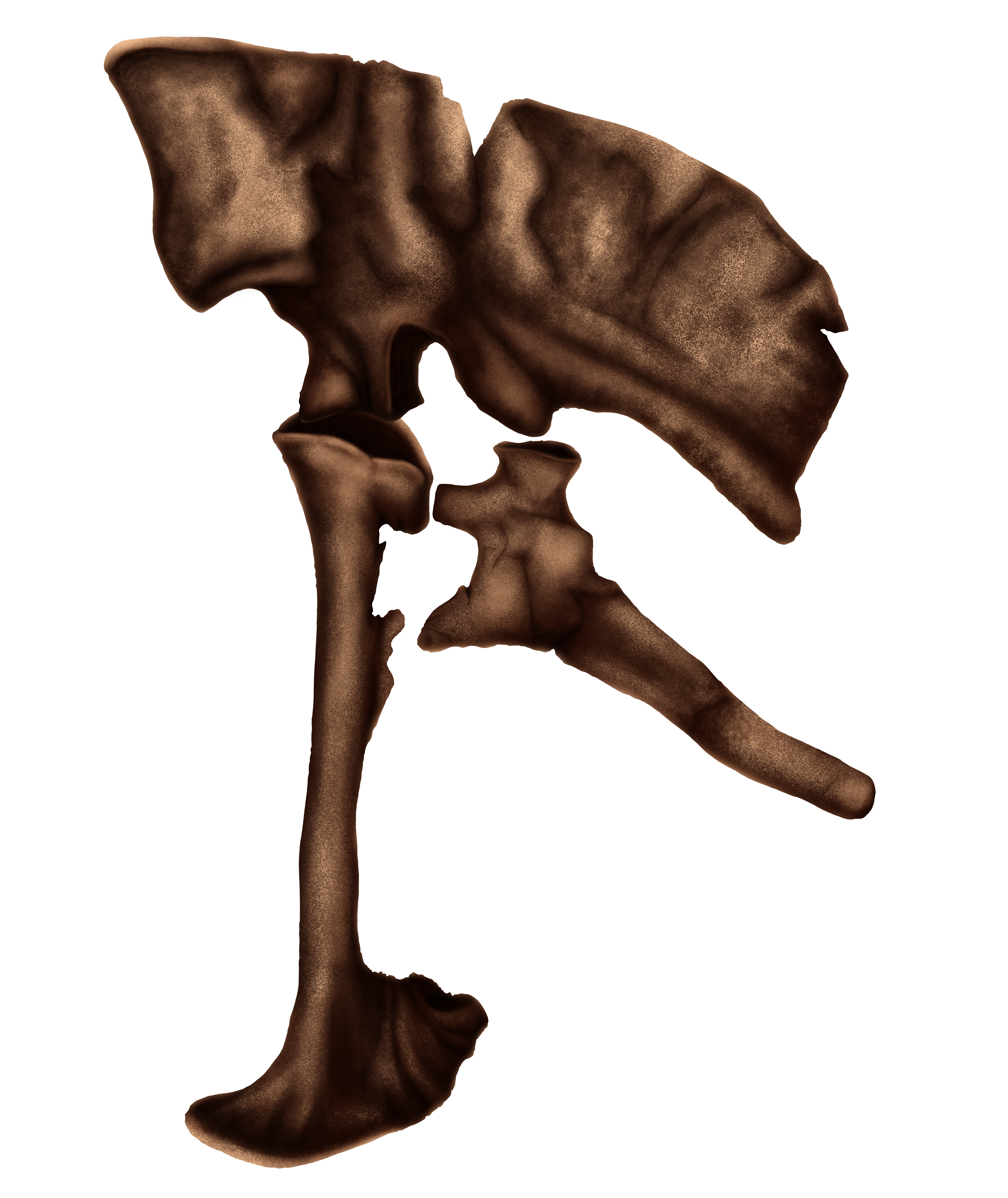
Illustration of the pelvis

However, the description was published in a very preliminary format, as it was incomplete, as well as having issues with preserved elements and numerous typographical errors. Due to a misinterpretation, the pedal ungual II (or sickle claw) was claimed to be preserved and to articulate with the pedal phalanx II, but this was corrected by Senter in 2007 and this ungual actually represents a manual one. Turner and colleagues, in 2012, during their large revision of Dromaeosauridae, stated that the describing paper of Achillobator was likely published without the knowledge of the two latter paleontologists, as indicated by a draft left in Mongolia in 1997.

On August 13, 1993, a large dromaeosaur claw was found at the Burkhant locality, which is the type locality of Achillobator, by a Japanese-Mongolian joint paleontological expedition. In 2010, paleontologist Mahito Watabe and colleagues reported that additional postcranial elements remains were found, all of which belonging to a large-sized dromaeosaurid. In 2007, Mongolian paleontologist Rinchen Barsbold and team reported new dinosaur fossil findings at the Shine Us Khuduk locality of the Bayan Shireh Formation. Among various elements, an isolated pedal phalange II-2 (second phalanx of the second digit of the foot) shares similar traits to that of Achillobator and "Troodon". The remains were discovered during excavations of the Mongolian Academy of Sciences in 2005 and 2006.

=== Chimera hypothesis ===
The pelvic girdle of Achillobator features plesiomorphic (primitive) saurischian characteristics compared to other dromaeosaurids. For instance, the pubis is aligned vertically and has a relatively large pubic boot (a wide expansion at the end), unlike most other dromaeosaurids, where a generally a much smaller boot is seen. The preserved vertebrae are very robust and feature a series of pleurocoels. The above differences led Burnham and team in 2000 to suggest that the holotype of Achillobator represents a paleontological chimera and only the pedal unguals may have come from a dromaeosaurid-grade dinosaur.

However, given that the specimen was actually found in semiarticulation, as well as all the elements being the same color and preservation quality, the assignment of remains to a single individual is supported. Despite the fact that Achillobator features unusual and primitive characteristics compared to other dromaeosaurids, it is commonly recovered as a taxon falling within Dromaeosauridae in cladistic analyses.

== Description ==
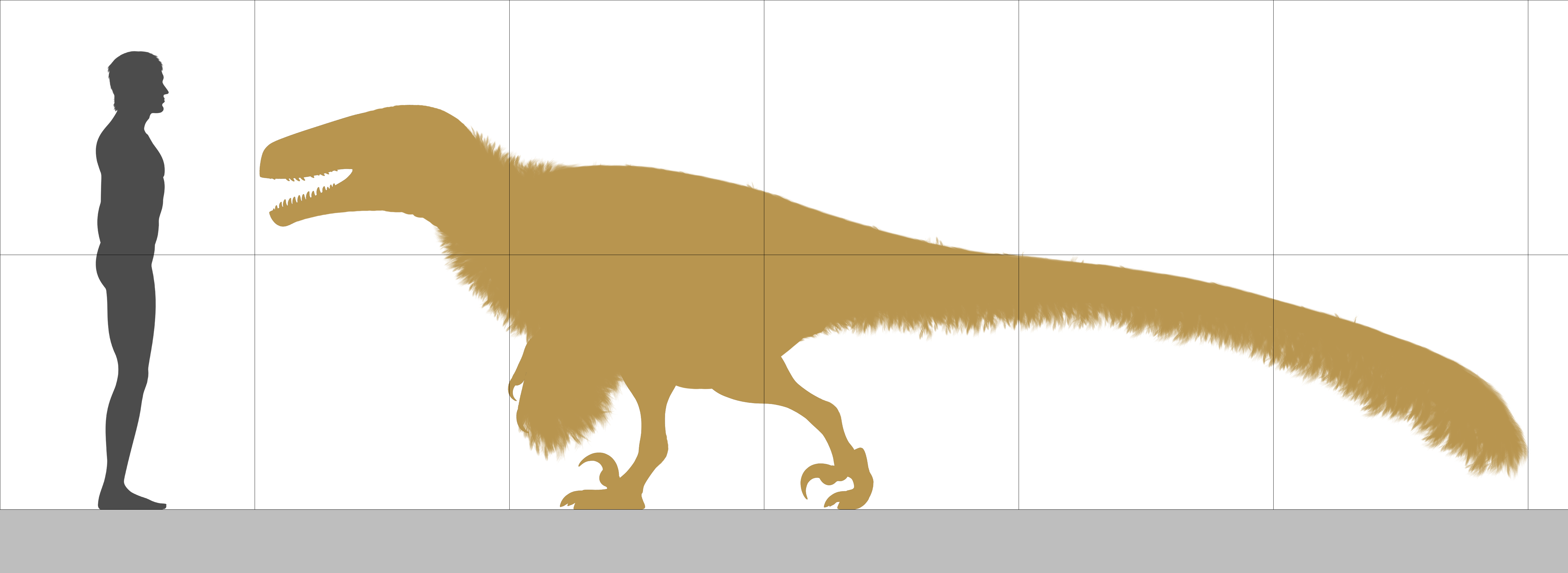
Size comparison of the holotype and an 1.8-m-tall human

Achillobator represents one of the largest described dromaeosaurid taxa, reaching up to 4.5–5 m (15–16 ft) long and weighing around 250–300 kg (550–660 lb) in body mass. Although the holotype was found lacking traces of feather integument, strong evidence coming from other relatives suggests the likely presence of plumage on Achillobator.

According to the revised diagnosis by Turner and colleagues in 2012, Achillobator can be distinguished based on the following combination of characteristics and autapomorphies: The promaxillary fenestra is completely exposed; the promaxillary and maxillary fenestrae are elongated and vertically oriented at same level in the maxilla; metatarsal III is wide on the upper end; the femur is longer than the tibia; the pelvis is propubic (pubis extends forward towards the head of the animal); the obturator process on the ischium is large and triangular situated on the upper half of ischial shaft; and the boot at distal symphysis of the pubis is developed in a cranial and caudal aspect.

=== Skull ===
The maxilla was deep and robust, and measured about 29 cm (290 mm) in length. Its lateral side was smooth compared to the dorsal areas, but had a robust constitution. It had approximately 11 alveoli (sockets that held the roots of teeth). The teeth of Achillobator displayed marked homodonty (teeth of similar shape and size) and they were serrated and recurved with the posterior serrations being slightly larger than the anterior serrations. Along with the posterior serrations were 15 or 18 denticles per 5 mm (0.50 cm) near the center of the teeth, although the anterior serrations had 17 to 20 denticles per 5 mm (0.50 cm). The dimensions of the maxilla suggest that Achillobator had a relatively large skull compared to those of carnosaurs.

=== Postcranial skeleton ===
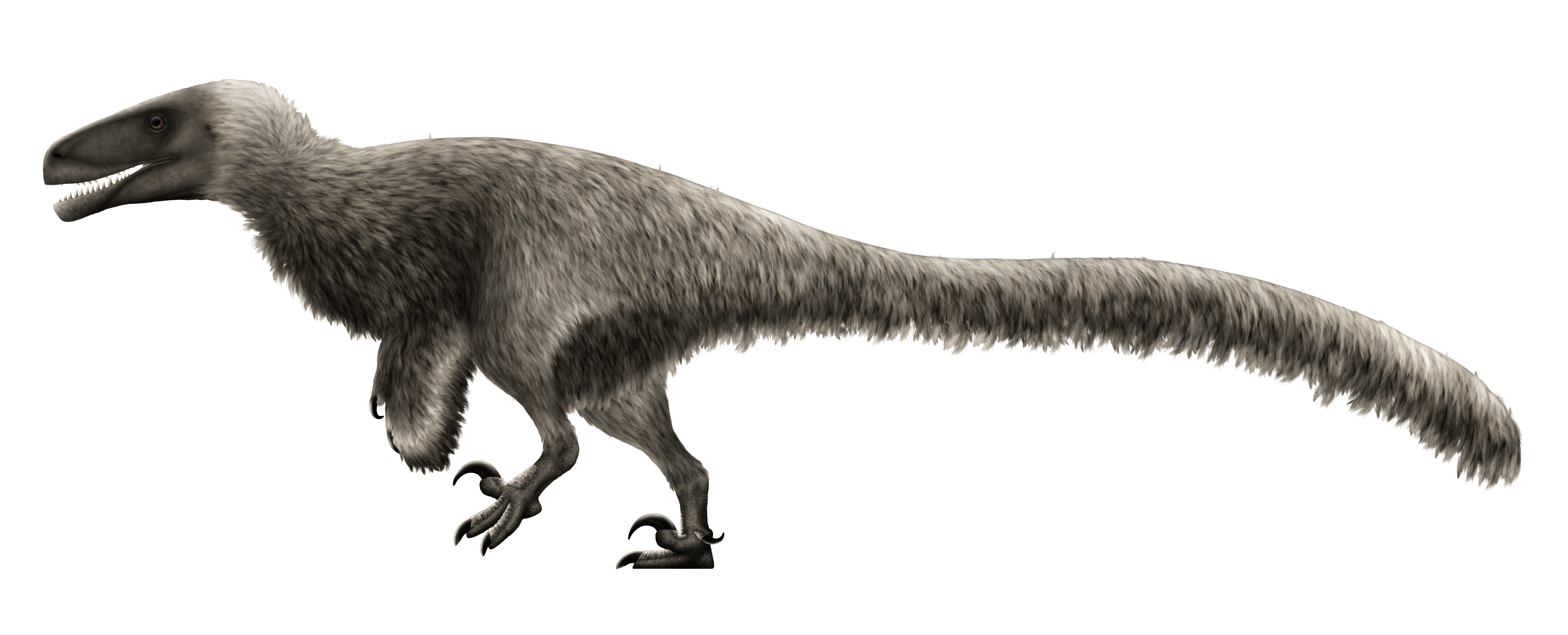
Life restoration

The vertebral column was composed of large and robust cervical, dorsal, and caudal vertebrae. The anterior series of cervical vertebrae were sharply angled in development, with the anterior articulation facet of the centrum developed over the posterior facet. These characteristics are interpreted as indicators of an S-shaped neck, as seen in most maniraptorans. The dorsal vertebrae were stocky and had pleurocoels at the lateral surfaces, increasing in posterior vertebrae. Their central articulation facets were rounded and concave in shape. The neural processes of the dorsal vertebrae show resemblance to those of large ratites such as the extinct moa and extant emu, ostrich, and cassowary, and they had protruding interspinous ligaments scars that indicates a robust and similar back to those birds. In all caudal vertebrae, the centrum was amphiplatian (flat on both ends) with the posterior articulation facet being more concave than the anterior one. As indicated by a transitional caudal, the anterior neural spines were elongated and progressively disappeared on posterior caudals. The posterior series of caudals was articulated with long chevrons and had very elongated prezygapophyses (projections of the vertebral arch that connect adjacent vertebrae).

The scapulocoracoid was formed by the fusion of the scapula and coracoid. In the posterior area of the acromion process, the scapula had a small tubercle that attached the area for the muscle m. scapulohumeralis in life. The glenoid was located at the bottom area facing to the lateral side. The scapula was relatively elongated and flattened at the scapular blade. The blade is thickened and slightly curved to the inner side following the rounded shape of the rib cage. The coracoid is robust and broad, measuring 16.7 cm (167 mm) long and 14.8 cm (148 mm) in height. The anterior edge had a coarse texture, likely for the articulation with cartilaginous tissue. A large foramen was located from the front to the back, probably acting as a channel for blood vessels and nerves. The radius measured 26 cm (260 mm) long.

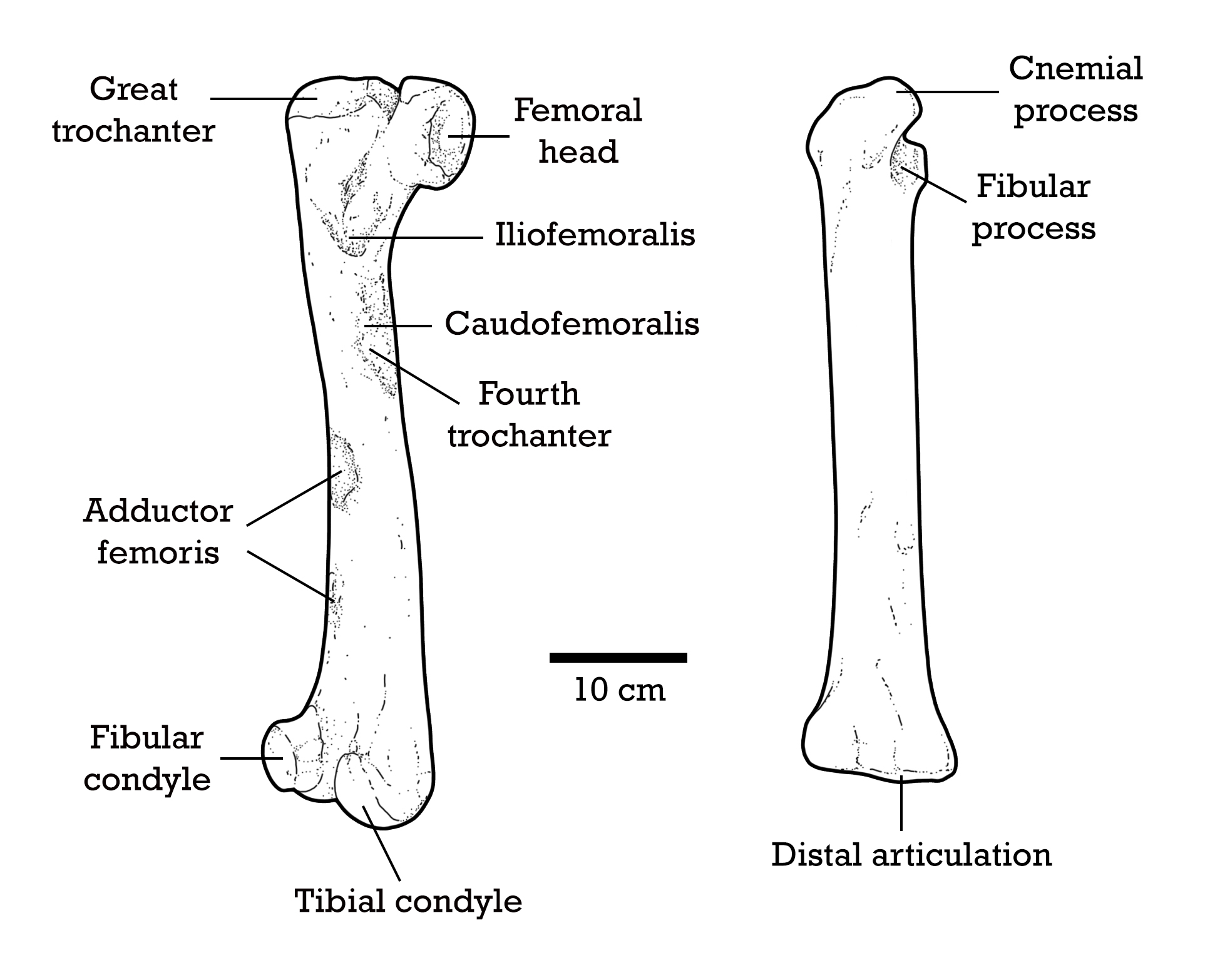
Diagram featuring the preserved tissue traces on femur and tibia

The femur was highly robust and longer than the tibia, a rare trait in dromaeosaurids, measuring 50.5 cm (505 mm) in length. On the anterior inner surface, there was a large, sculptured and concave surface that likely worked as the insertion for the m. iliofemoralis internus in life, and the lesser trochanter had the insertion for the m. pubo ischio femoralis on the lower edge. On the upper lateral surface of the femur, bottom-oriented to the greater trochanter, there was a tubercle that formed the attachment for the m. iliofemoralis. Insertions for m. ilio trochantericus and ischio trochantericus were located on the posterolateral surface at the proximal end of the femur. In the inner side, on the proximal third part of the shaft, a coarse, concave area likely attached m. pubo ischio femoralis externus-3. Below this area, a small, convex tubercle attended the insertion for m. pubo ischio femoralis-2. The tibia was less robust than the femur, but straighter, measuring 49 cm (490 mm) in length. The surface of the shaft center was smooth, without traces of muscles. In front and towards the back surface of the cnemial crest, however, a coarse and microsculptured area worked as the attachment for m. ilio tibialis and ambiens. Additional tissue traces in the tibia were located on the lower surface and towards the posterior aspect. Here, a depression with a somewhat coarse surface likely attached prominent aponeurosis of the connected ligaments to the tibia and fibular head in life.

Metatarsals III and IV were stocky, measuring 23.4 cm (234 mm) and 20.9 cm (209 mm), respectively, indicating that the length of the metatarsus was under the 50% of the tibial length. As in other maniraptorans, the metatarsals were closely united. The top end of metatarsal III was side-to-side flattened and not pinched at the upper end, thus lacking an arctometatarsalian (pinched upper end) condition. The lower end of metatarsal IV had a joint where motion was restricted to one plane, and the lateral condyle was short. The pelvis was formed by the pubis, ilium, and ischium bones. The ilium was prominently tall, measuring 51.3 cm (513 mm) in length and 28.8 cm (288 mm) in height with the preacetabular process situated from top to bottom. Both insertions for the m. caudofemoralis were located at the inner surface of the ilium. On the anterior edge were microstriations that likely gave form to the m. iliofemoralis in life, behind to this area, traces of the m. ilio tibialis-2 were also present. The pubis measured 54.8 cm (548 mm) long and is very straight, having a large pubic boot (a wide expansion at the end). While other dromaeosaurids had a very opisthopubic pelvic configuration, Achillobator had a primitive propubic configuration. The large pubic boot had coarse areas on the dorsal surface that served as attachment sites for the m. pubo ischio femoralis internus ventralis. Its lateral surface was very flat and had numerous microstriations that probably originated the m. pubo ischio femoralis externus. The ischium was shorter than the ilium and pubis, measuring 37.8 cm (378 mm) in length. A large ridge was formed on its shaft and expanded to the anterior edge, likely forming the m. adductor femoris in life. This ridge-like structure was heavily built compared to other dromaeosaurids. At the lateral sides, the surface was very rough, possibly attaching m. flexor tibialis internus-1 in life.

== Classification ==
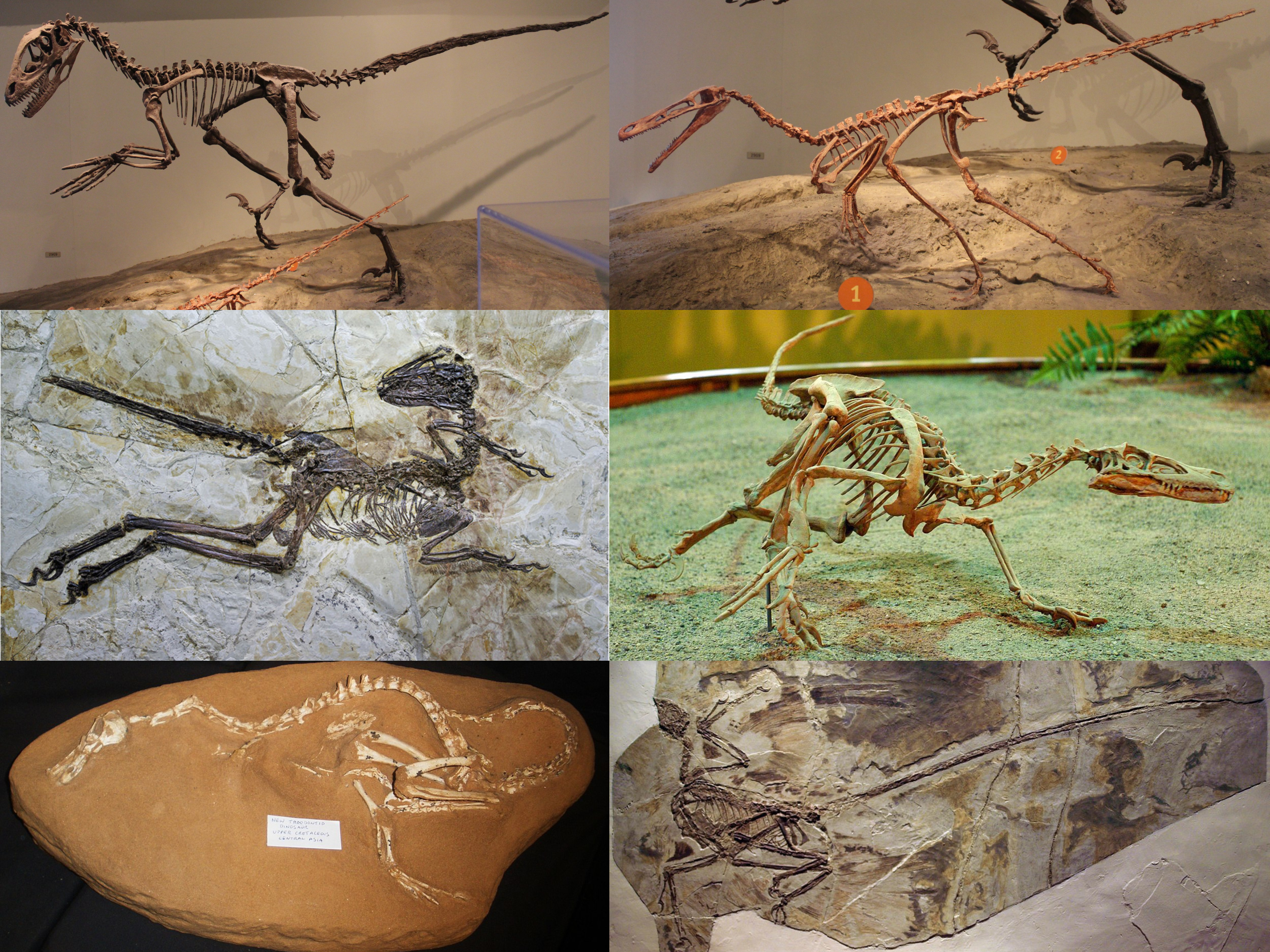
Many genera of the Dromaeosauridae

In its original description, Achillobator was placed as a close relative of Dromaeosaurus with an ambiguous position in the family. In more recent and solid research Achillobator is classified within the Dromaeosauridae, a group of very bird-like, maniraptoran dinosaurs, being placed in the Eudromaeosauria, a group of dromaeosaurids that were obligate terrestrial and hypercarnivore animals, better known as the "true dromaeosaurids". They strongly differ from other dromaeosaurs, such as the arboreal microraptorians or amphibious halszkaraptorines. Eudromaeosauria was first defined as a node-based clade by Nicholas R. Longrich and Philip J. Currie in 2009 as the most inclusive natural group containing Dromaeosaurus, Velociraptor, Deinonychus, and Saurornitholestes, their most recent common ancestor and all of its other descendants. The various "subfamilies" have also been re-defined as clades, usually defined as all species closer to the groups namesake than to Dromaeosaurus or any namesakes of other sub-clades.

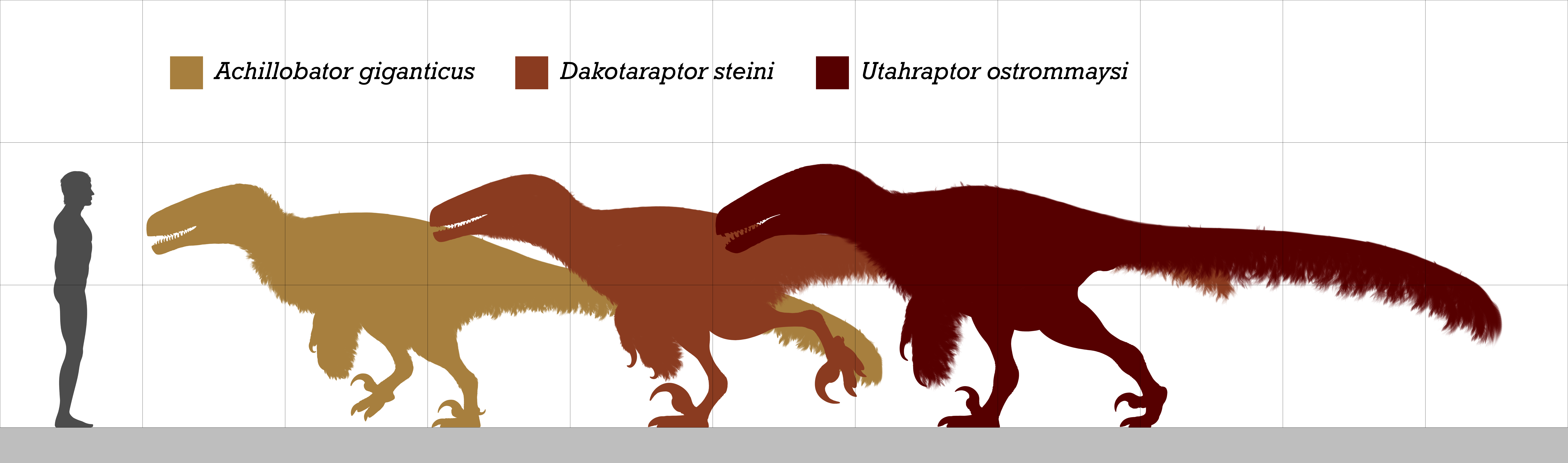
Comparison between giant dromaeosaurids including Achillobator

Most phylogenetic analyses recover Achillobator as a relative of Utahraptor. Similarities between Achillobator and Utahraptor were found by osteological reexamination of Utahraptor specimens, supporting their close relationship. The exact position of these two vary; during the description of Halszkaraptor in 2017, Achillobator and Utahraptor were recovered as close relatives of Dromaeosaurus in the Dromaeosaurinae. However, other studies place the two in the Velociraptorinae, such as Currie and Evans (2019) and Jasinski et al. (2020). An unusual result was found by Hartman and colleagues in 2019, where both Utahraptor and Achillobator were found to be outside Dromaeosaurinae and Velociraptorinae, joined by Yixianosaurus, which is usually considered an anchiornithid.

The left cladogram follows Cau et al. 2017, while the right cladogram follows Jasinski et al. 2020:

- Eudromaeosauria
  - Bambiraptor
  - - Tianyuraptor
    - - - Dromaeosaurinae
          - Achillobator
          - - Dromaeosaurus
            - Utahraptor
      - Velociraptorinae
        - Adasaurus
        - - - Deinonychus
            - Saurornitholestes
          - - Velociraptor
            - - Linheraptor
              - Tsaagan

- Eudromaeosauria
  - Saurornitholestinae
    - Saurornitholestes
    - Atrociraptor
  - - Dromaeosaurinae
      - Dakotaraptor
      - - Dromaeosaurus
        - Boreonykus
        - Bayan Shireh dromaeosaurid
    - - Deinonychus
      - - - Adasaurus
          - - Utahraptor
            - Achillobator
        - Velociraptorinae
          - Acheroraptor
          - - Velociraptor
            - - Dineobellator
              - - Tsaagan
                - Linheraptor

== Paleobiology ==
Perle and team pointed out in 1999 that the structure of the hindlimbs and pelvic region of Achillobator indicates that the animal had massive thighs and robustly built legs suited for moderate fast-running. In addition, the prominent pelvis of Achillobator has its own specialized femoral muscle retractors that may indicate a strong ability for leaping.

In 2016, Scott Persons IV and Currie examined the limb proportion of numerous theropods and found that compsognathids, troodontids and tyrannosauroids were cursorial animals with many taxa recovered with relatively high CLP (cursorial-limb-proportion) scores. Dromaeosaurids however, were recovered with low CLP scores, with Achillobator scoring −5.3 suggesting that it was not adapted to maintain high speeds for extended amounts of time.

=== Predatory behavior ===
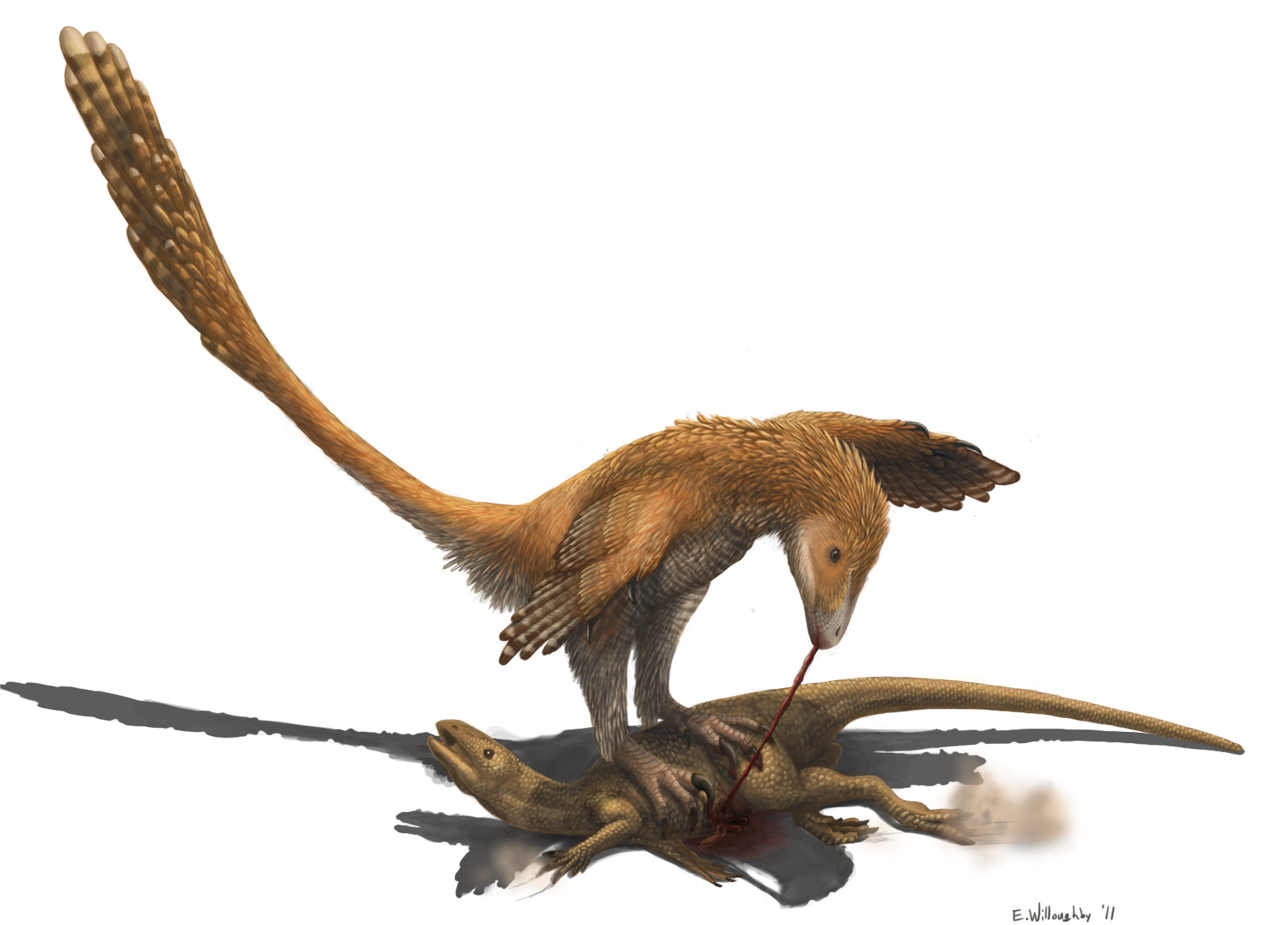
A leaping Deinonychus employing RPR on Zephyrosaurus

In 2009 Longrich and Currie suggested that while other dromaeosaurids filled a variety of specialized ecological niches like the slender unenlagiines, eudromaeosaurs, such as Achillobator, retained a conservative life-style and filled the niche of large-bodied predators of often medium to large-sized prey.

Manning and team in 2009 tested the function of the sickle claw of dromaeosaurids by analyzing the biomechanics of how stresses and strains would be distributed along the claws and into the limbs, and using comparisons within the curvature of the dromaeosaurid sickle claw on the foot with curvature in modern birds and mammals. They found that they were ideal for climbing and for a ground-dwelling life style. Peter Mackovicky stated that the analysis might be correct on primitive dromaeosaurids (such as Microraptor) being tree-climbers, however, this does not explain why giant animals like Achillobator or Utahraptor retained sickle claws as they were likely far too large to have climbed trees with any great faculty. Mackovicky suggested that larger dromaeosaurids adapted the claw to be used exclusively for a more aggressive predatory behavior.

The striking resemblance between the feet and legs of dromaeosaurids and those of accipitrid birds of prey, led Fowler et al. 2011 to propose that dromaeosaurids hunted in a similar way to those of raptorial birds. They found that the feet and legs of dromaeosaurs resemble those of eagles and hawks by having an enlarged second claw and a similar range of flexion, but the metatarsals share more resemblance to those of owls. The model RPR (Raptor Prey Restraint), proposes that dromaeosaurs leaped into their prey, immobilizing it with their body weight, and then hold it tightly with the large, sickle-shaped claws; afterwards, the dromaeosaur would start to feed on the animal while it's still alive and the death will eventually come from blood loss and organ failure. The arms or "wings", that were likely covered in long feathers, may have been flapped by the dromaeosaur in order to stabilize its balance while restraining prey, along with this, the long, feathered tail probably worked as a counter-balance to the main body. Lastly, the snout would have been useful for finishing off its prey. With these observations, they established that dromaeosaurids and troodontids were niche partitioned as large and small prey predators, respectively.

In 2020, Powers and colleagues re-examined the maxillae of eudromaeosaur taxa concluding that Asian and North American eudromaeosaurs were separated by snout morphology and ecological strategies. They found the maxilla to be a reliable reference when inferring the shape of the premaxilla and overall snout. For instance, most Asian species have elongated snouts based on the maxilla (animals like Velociraptor are known from complete skulls), indicating a selective feeding, such as picking up small, fast prey. Achillobator however, is an exception for Asian eudromaeosaurs, featuring a robust and deep maxillar morphology similar to North American eudromaeosaurs such as Acheroraptor. The moderate score of its maxilla suggests it was a generalist in feeding habits.

== Paleoenvironment ==
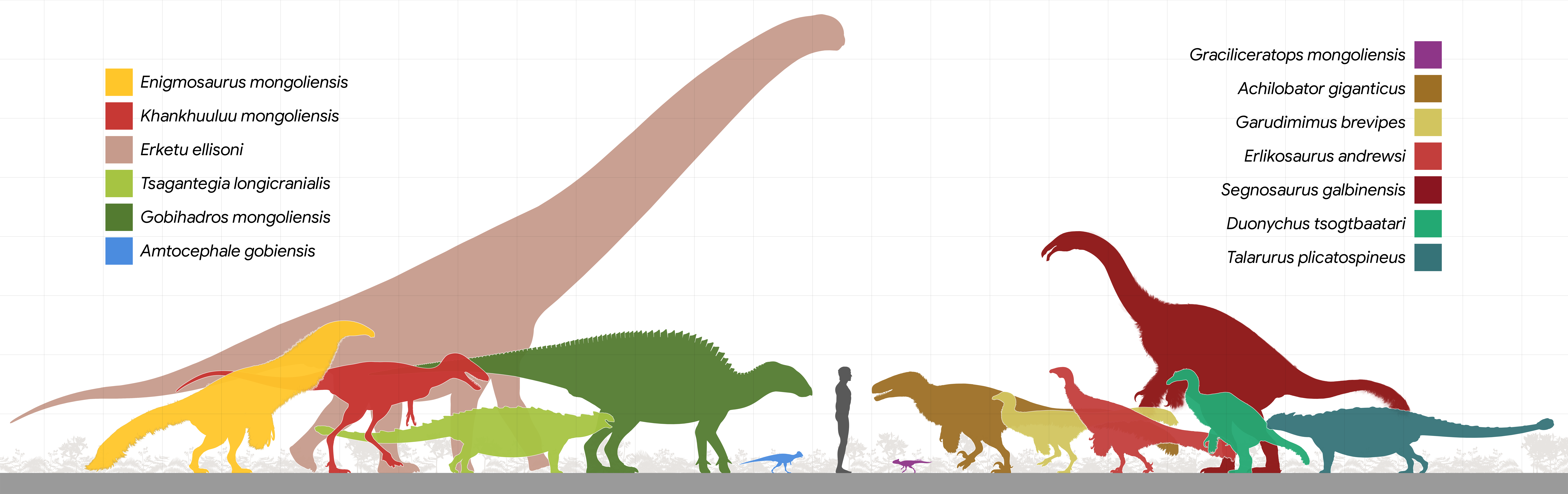
Achillobator compared to the known dinosaurs of the Bayan Shireh Formation (Achillobator in dark yellow, second from right)

The remains of Achillobator were unearthed from the Burkhant locality of the Bayan Shireh Formation. This formation has been divided into upper and lower parts, with some localities representing Lower and Upper Cretaceous boundary. Burkhant, the type locality of Achillobator, has been identified as an Upper Cretaceous-boundary locality. Analyses on the magnetostratigraphy of the formation indicate that the entire Bayan Shireh lies within the Cretaceous Long Normal, which lasted only until the end of the Santonian stage, giving a Cenomanian-Santonian age. The recent calcite U–Pb analyses performed by Kurudama and colleagues in 2020 have confirm the age of the Bayan Shireh Formation from 95.9 ± 6.0 million to 89.6 ± 4.0 million years ago, also supporting a Cenomanian-Santonian age. Over the time, a strong correlation with the Iren Dabasu Formation has been proposed by numerous authors mainly based on the similar fossil assemblages. This hypothesis may be also supported by the similar ages.

The environments that were present in the Bayan Shireh Formation and Achillobator inhabited were relatively humid and had extensive fluvial and lacustrine facies, that is, a well-watered region dominated by prominent meanders, rivers, lakes and streams. The climate of the formation was slightly semi-arid, as seen on caliche-based sediments. Angiosperms were largely present in the formation, based on fossils of cornaceans and fossilized fruits at several localities.

=== Contemporary paleofauna ===
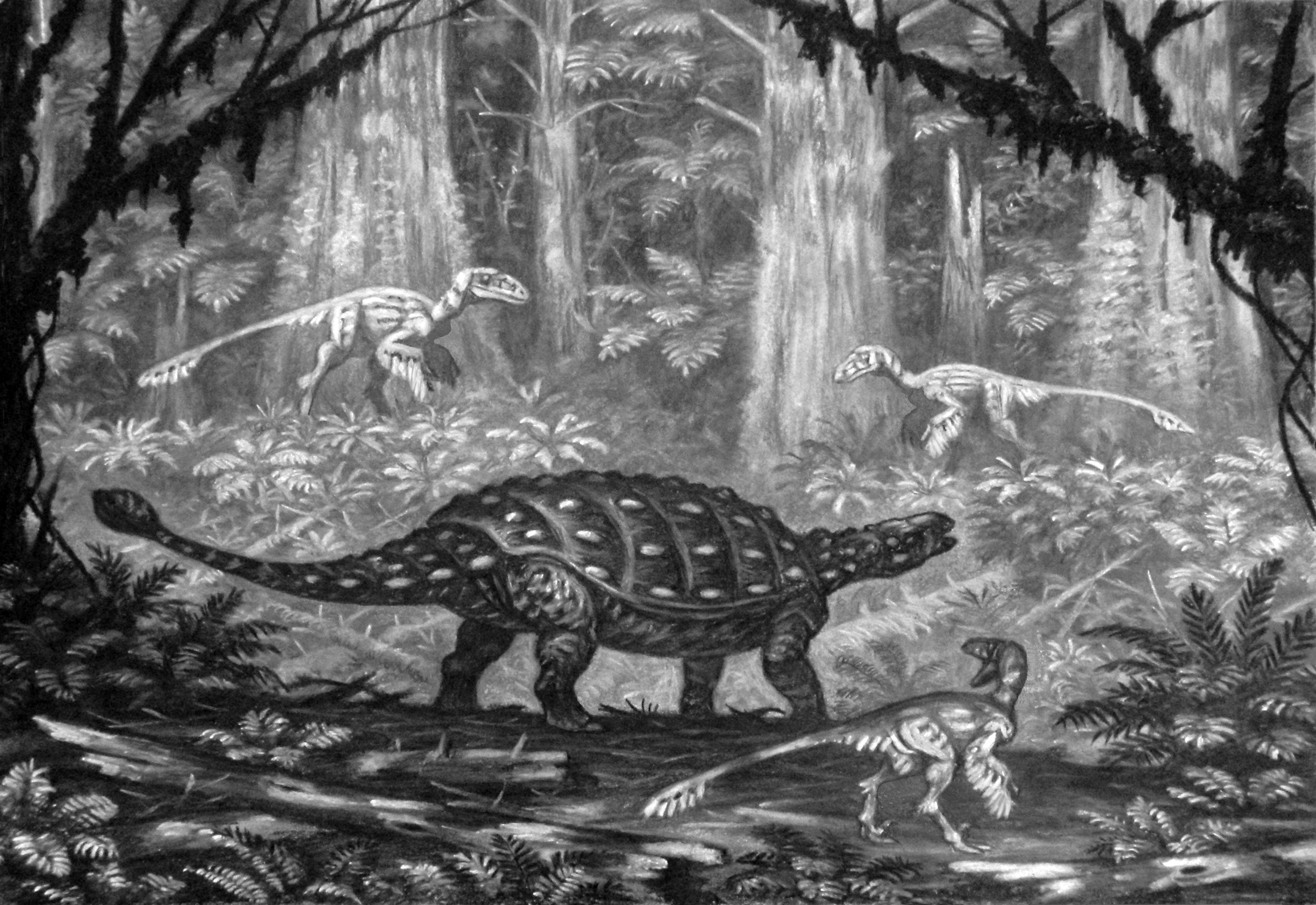
Restoration of an Achillobator pack surrounding an adult Talarurus

Achillobator shared its surroundings in the Bayan Shireh Formation with other theropods such as the medium-sized therizinosaurs Erlikosaurus and Segnosaurus, the ornithomimosaur Garudimimus, and the tyrannosauroid Khankhuuluu. The large, long-necked sauropod Erketu is also found in the same formation. Ornithischians from the same formation include the heavy-built ankylosaurs Talarurus and Tsagantegia, the small marginocephalians Amtocephale and Graciliceratops, and the hadrosauroid Gobihadros. Non-dinosaur taxa was present as well, mostly compromising semiaquatic and terrestrial reptiles like the turtles Lindholmemys, Gobiapalone and "Trionyx"; and the crocodylomorph Paralligator. Fishes are also known from the formation, such as the shark Hybodus and the remains of osteichthyans at various localities. Mammals were extremely rare around the formation.

Niche partitioning has been reported among Bayan Shireh species, such is the case of high browser therizinosaurids Erlikosaurus and Segnosaurus, or the grazer Talarurus and browser Tsagantegia. Erketu may have been the tallest herbivore of the paleofauna.

== See also ==
- Timeline of dromaeosaurid research
