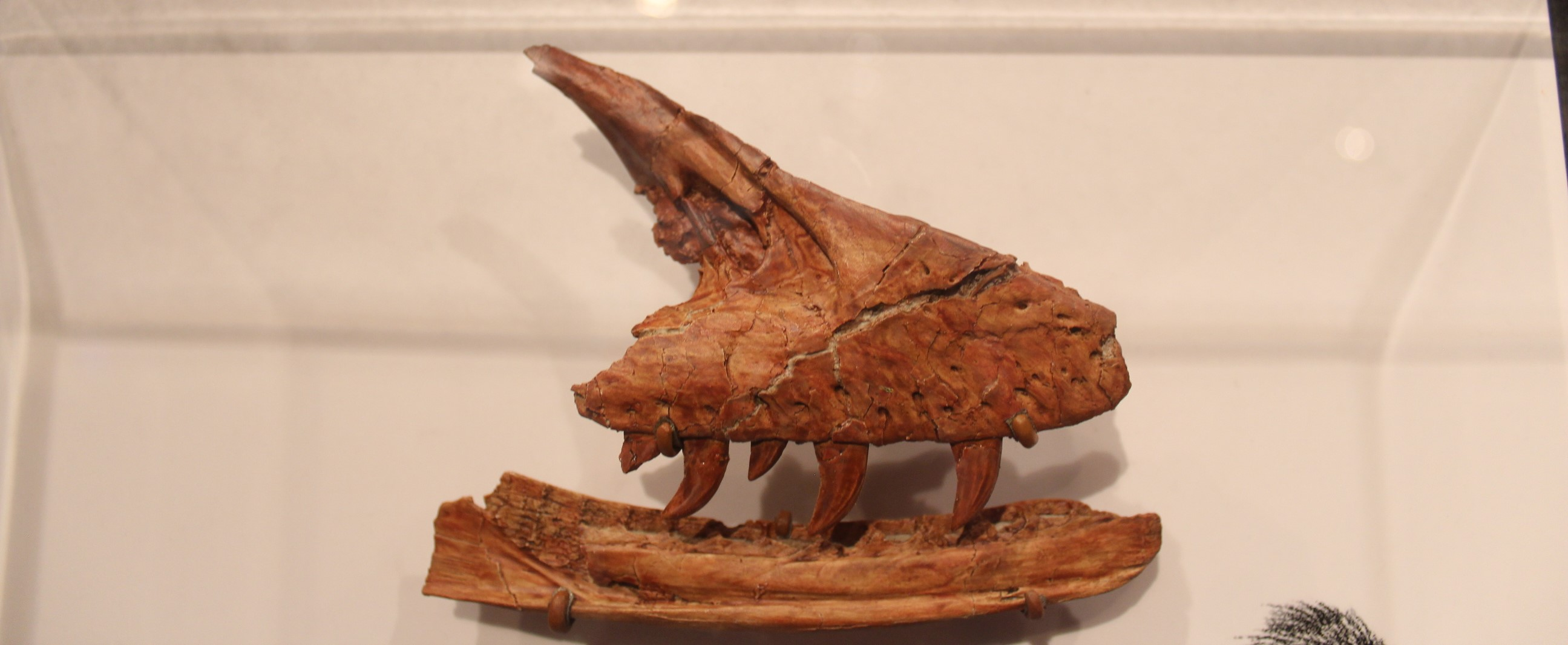
- Casts of the holotype maxilla and referred dentary, National Museum of Natural History.

Scientific classification
- Kingdom: Animalia
- Phylum: Chordata
- Class: Reptilia
- Clade: Dinosauria
- Clade: Saurischia
- Clade: Theropoda
- Clade: Pennaraptora
- Clade: Paraves
- Family: †Dromaeosauridae
- Genus: †Acheroraptor; Evans et al., 2013

Type species
- †Acheroraptor temertyorum Evans et al., 2013

= Acheroraptor =

Acheroraptor Temporal range: Late Cretaceous (Maastrichtian), 67.2–66 Ma

Dromaeosaurid dinosaur genus from the Late Cretaceous

Acheroraptor (meaning "underworld thief") is an extinct genus of dromaeosaurid theropod dinosaur that lived in present-day Montana in the United States during the Maastrichtian stage of the Late Cretaceous period. It was described by Canadian paleontologists David Evans, Derek Larson, and Philip J. Currie in 2013. The genus contains a single species, A. temertyorum, based on an isolated maxilla with teeth. An incomplete dentary found nearby was also assigned to the species. These fossils were initially discovered by commercial fossil collectors in the Hell Creek Formation, and were later sold to the Royal Ontario Museum. Acheroraptor is among the geologically youngest dromaeosaurids.

== Discovery and naming ==
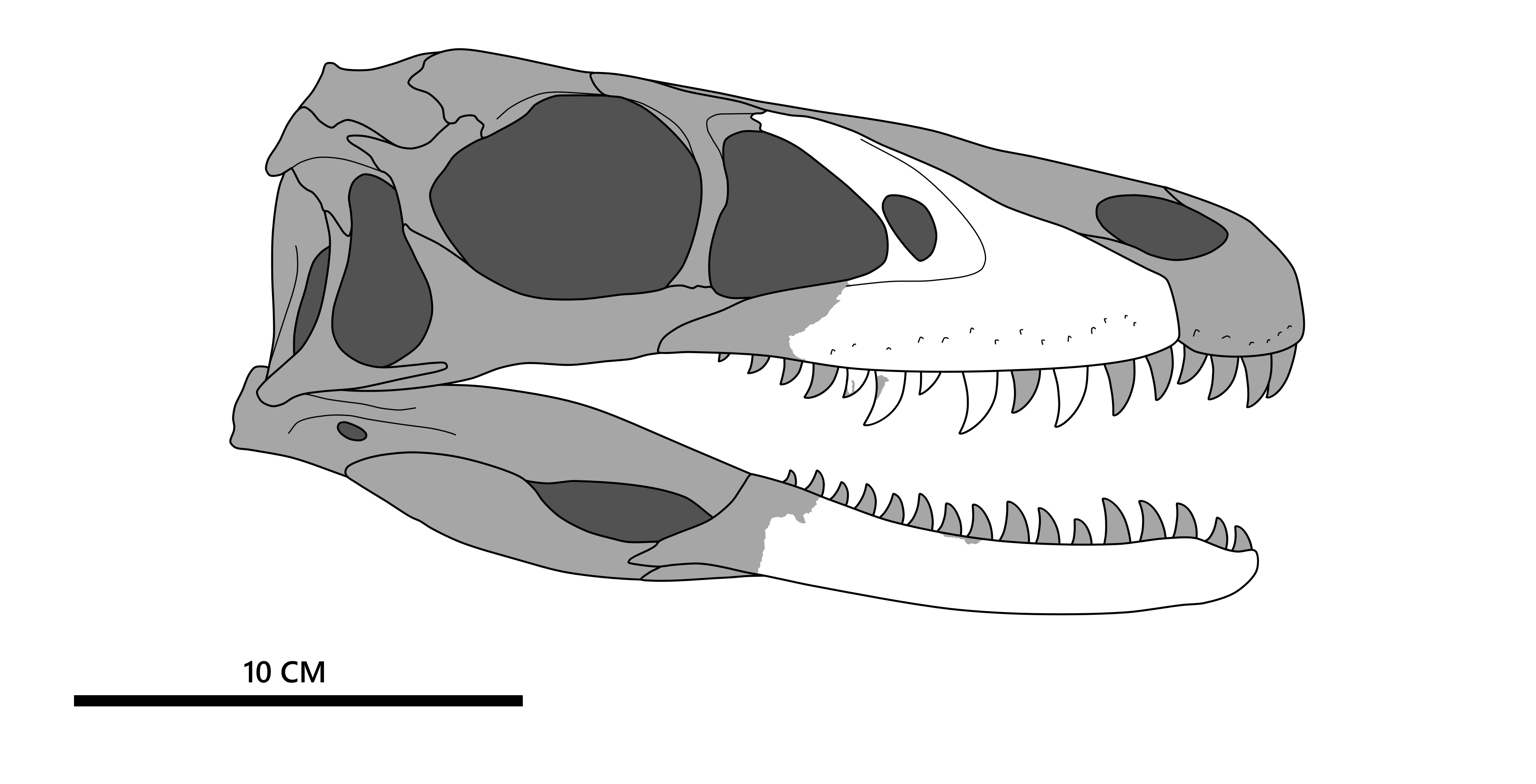
Reconstruction of the skull of Acheroraptor as a saurornitholestine, known material highlighted in white.

Fossils of Acheroraptor were first collected on 28 August 2009 by commercial fossil collectors in sediments of the Hell Creek Formation in a site 45 kilometres (28 mi) southwest of Jordan, Garfield County, Montana in the western United States. The remains found consisted of a complete right maxilla with several maxillary teeth, cataloged as ROM 63777 at the Royal Ontario Museum in Toronto, and an assigned dentary, ROM 63778. The two fossils were found in a layer of reddish sandstone made up of a bonebed including other small vertebrate and invertebrate shell fossils, though the dentary was found around 4 metres (13 ft) away in the same layer. Photographs of the fossils in situ and GPS data were provided by the original collectors, one of whom collected the dentary several years after the maxilla was found. The ROM subsequently purchased the two fossils from a private collector. The strata where these fossils were unearthed derives from the upper part of the Hell Creek Formation, dating to the latest Maastrichtian stage of the Late Cretaceous, immediately prior to the Cretaceous–Paleogene extinction event.

In 2013, Canadian paleontologists David Evans, Derek Larson, and Philip J. Currie scientifically described the remains and assigned them to a new genus and species of dromaeosaurid theropod, which they named Acheroraptor temertyorum. The generic name Acheroraptor is a combination of the Greek word Ἀχέρων, Acheron, the River of Pain in the underworld of ancient Greek mythology, in reference to the provenance from the Hell Creek Formation, and the Latin word raptor, "thief", a common suffix in dromaeosaurid names. The specific name honors James and Louise Temerty, the chairman of Northland Power and the ROM Board of Governors and his wife, who have supported the museum for many years. The maxilla ROM 63777 was selected as the holotype specimen of A. temertyorum.

The discovery of Acheroraptor was significant as it was the first diagnostic late Maastrichtian North American dromaeosaurid reported in literature, though the possibly chimeric Dakotaraptor and the New Mexican Dineobellator are now known as well. An abstract from the 2020 Canadian Society of Vertebrate Paleontology Meeting reported new findings on Acheroraptor and its holotype locality (abbreviated as AHL). Instead of belonging to the upper half of the Hell Creek Formation, the AHL actually comes from the lower-middle half based on palynological data. Additionally, postcranial material consisting of three manual phalanges and a claw were assigned to Acheroraptor.

== Description ==
Size of Acheroraptor compared to a human

In its initial description, Acheroraptor was described as a "mid-sized" dromaeosaurid. The lead author of its description stated that it was similar in size to Deinonychus, which was estimated to be around 3.3–3.4 meters (10 ft 10 in – 11 ft 2 in) long and weighed up to 60–73 kg (132–161 lb) or even 100 kg (220 lb).

The holotype includes a nearly complete right maxilla and several teeth, with minor crushing, cracks, and missing a small section of the jugal ramus. The anterior region of the antorbital fossa, which Evans, Larson and Currie (2013) defined as the zone between the anterior frontier of the antorbital fenestra and the antorbital fossa, is relatively small when compared to related genera. This zone measures only 20 millimetres (0.79 in) long and is around half the length of the lateral maxillary lamina, forming a ratio of 2.25. In contrast, other North American dromaeosaurids like Bambiraptor and Saurornitholestes have a much larger anterior region and lower ratio. In this area are the promaxillary and maxillary fenestrae as well, which are overall similar to those of dromaeosaurids like Atrociraptor and Saurornitholestes. The height between the maxillary fenestra and the tooth row is less than twice that of the height of the largest maxillary tooth in Acheroraptor and taxa such as Saurornitholestes, Deinonychus, Dromaeosaurus, and Bambiraptor.

As for the referred dentary, its preserved section bears 15 alveoli, though it likely had 16 or 17 teeth per dentary. The presence of a vertically oriented Meckelian groove and fused interdental plates suggest that the dentary does not belong to Richardoestesia or a troodontid, which are also known from the Hell Creek Formation. At the apex of the dentary is a slight "chin", one much weaker than that observed in the related Velociraptor.

== Classification ==
Acheroraptor belonged to the family Dromaeosauridae, a group of theropods that existed during the Cretaceous in the Americas, Antarctica, Asia, and Oceania. This group includes several subfamilies as well in addition to Eudromaeosauria ("the true dromaeosaurids"), which contains Acheroraptor. Outside of the node Eudromaeosauria is three subfamilies: Microraptorinae, Halszkaraptorinae, and Unenlagiinae. Within Eudromaeosauria includes the subfamilies Dromaeosaurinae, Saurornitholestinae, and Velociraptorinae, however the classification of genera within these groups and their relationships to each other are unclear.

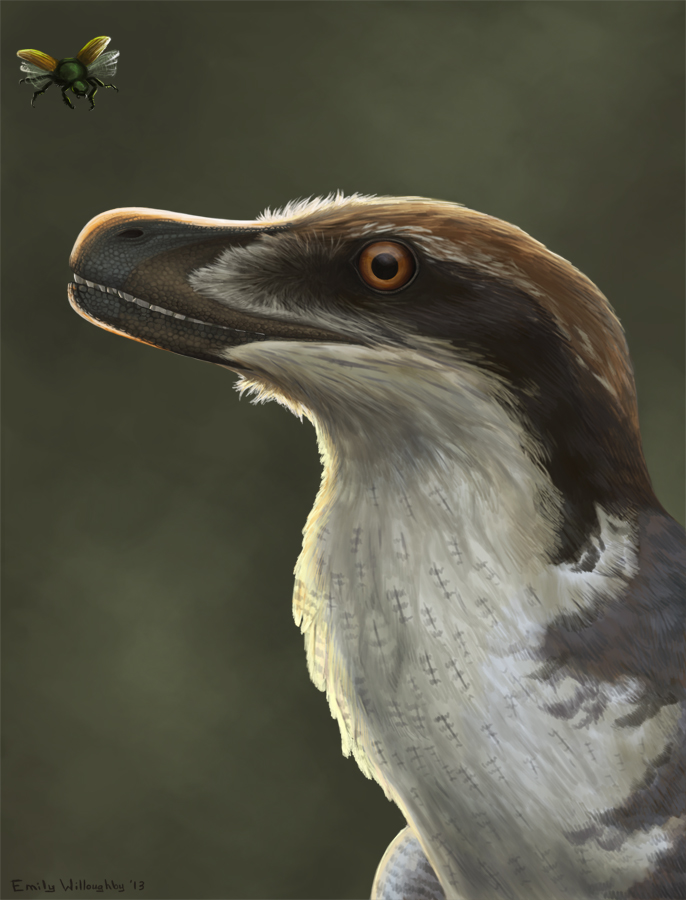
A speculative life restoration

The position of Acheroraptor within Dromaeosauridae has been contentious; Evans, Larson, and Currie (2013) phylogenetic analyses used several data matrices. Both specimens of Acheroraptor were coded as a single taxon into Turner et al. (2012) data matrix, an extensive phylogenetic analysis of theropods that focuses on maniraptorans. Acheroraptor was recovered as a member of the clade containing Eudromaeosauria and Microraptorinae, confirming its referral to the Dromaeosauridae, and possibly to Eudromaeosauria. Within that clade, however, most taxa were recovered in a large polytomy, due to the limited codings available for Acheroraptor. Evans et al. (2013) also coded the specimens of Acheroraptor (together and separately) into an updated version of the smaller, dromaeosaur-specific dataset from Longrich and Currie (2009). Velociraptor osmolskae and Balaur bondoc were added, Itemirus was excluded (following its identification as a tyrannosauroid by Miyashita and Currie (2009)), and following Turner et al. (2012) the codings for Adasaurus mongoliensis were separated into these based on the holotype from the Nemegt Formation, and these based on IGM 100/23 from the Bayanshiree Formation. Several characters were also rescored and modified, and two maxillary characters were added to the matrix from Turner et al. (2012). This analysis yielded a more resolved topology, placing Acheroraptor in a relatively basal position within the Velociraptorinae, which was otherwise found to include only Asian dromaeosaurids. The cladogram below shows the phylogenetic position of Acheroraptor following this analysis.

- Dromaeosauridae
  - Mahakala omnogovae
  - Unenlagiinae
  - - Microraptoria
    - Eudromaeosauria
      - - Bambiraptor feinbergi
        - Saurornitholestes langstoni
      - - - Atrociraptor marshalli
          - Deinonychus antirrhopus
        - - Dromaeosaurinae
            - Achillobator giganticus
            - Balaur bondoc
            - Dromaeosaurus albertensis
            - Dakotaraptor steini
            - Utahraptor ostrommaysi
          - Velociraptorinae
            - Acheroraptor temertyorum
            - - Velociraptor mongoliensis
              - - Adasaurus mongoliensis
                - Tsaagan mangas
                - Velociraptor osmolskae

In studies since, Acheroraptor has been recovered in various positions in Dromaeosauridae. In two 2020 studies, Acheroraptor was classified as a basal member of the subfamily Velociraptorinae which, along with taxa like Dineobellator or even Deinonychus, would extend the known range of the group to North America. However, the 2015 description of Boreonykus recovered Acheroraptor in a polytomy in Velociraptorinae with little recognition of its affinities. In contrast, a 2020 paper describing Hesperornithoides found Acheroraptor as a member of Microraptorinae, a clade of arboreal, gliding dromaeosaurids previously restricted to the Early Cretaceous period. However, the authors said it had little support and that the use of isolated jaws for classification was unreliable. A 2022 study of eudromaeosauria reclassified Acheroraptor as a derived member of Saurornitholestinae, with Atrociraptor as its sister taxon, a result replicated by other papers. The results of Jasinski and colleagues (2022) are below:

- Dromaeosauridae
  - Halszkaraptor
  - - Microraptorinae
      - Shanag
      - Sinornithosaurus
    - - Tianyuraptor
      - Zhenyuanlong
      - Unenlagiinae
      - Eudromaeosauria
        - Dineobellator
        - Dromaeosaurinae
          - Utahraptor
          - - Achillobator
            - Dromaeosaurus
        - Velociraptorinae
          - Adasaurus
          - Velociraptor mongoliensis
          - Velociraptor osmolskae
          - - Linheraptor
            - Tsaagan
        - Saurornitholestinae
          - Deinonychus
          - - - Bambiraptor
              - Saurornitholestes
            - - Acheroraptor
              - Atrociraptor

== Paleobiology ==
An examination of the bite force of Acheroraptor suggests that like members of the Velociraptorinae, it was equipped with relatively weak jaws for inflicting rapid, slashing bites on smaller prey. This likewise indicates that saurornitholestines were more diverse in predation habits and ecological roles than previously assumed.

== Paleoecology ==
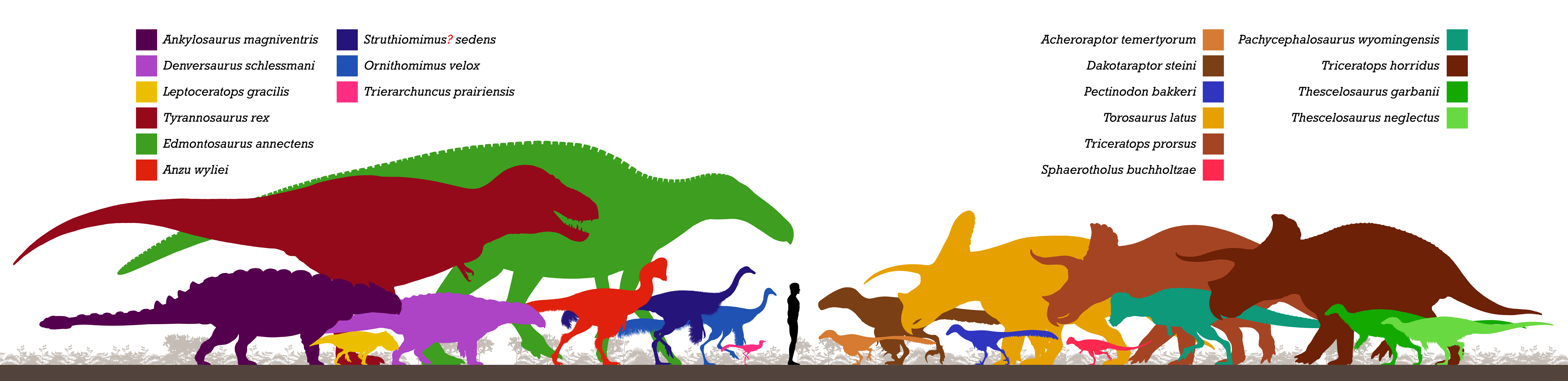
Acheroraptor and other fauna from Hell Creek (Acheroraptor in light orange)

Acheroraptor was first found in the Hell Creek Formation, which spans parts of modern-day Montana, South Dakota, North Dakota, and Wyoming. The depositional environment of this region was warm, humid, and swampy environment, reflecting maritime to subtropical conditions. The average temperatures ranged from 11.3–11.6 °C (52.3–52.9 °F). The landscape featured lush, low-lying vegetation dominated by ferns, while the forest canopy consisted of a mixture of diverse conifers (redwoods, cypresses, and pine-like trees) and angiosperms (flowering plants including sycamores, members of the magnolia family, rosids, laurels, various palms, and more). Cycads and Ginkgo trees were also present. The wetlands and waterways contained a diverse faunal assemblage. Small insects are known from what would have been the swampy forests, while the rivers and lagoons hosted invertebrates (bivalves and ammonites), fish (sharks, hybodonts, gars, and sturgeons), amphibians (frogs and salamanders), and various reptiles (turtles, crocodilians, the choristodere Champsosaurus, and mosasaurs in the coastal, brackish, and freshwater zones). Small terrestrial mammals and lizards were diverse, living alongside early snakes. Pterosaurs are represented by the azhdarchid Infernodrakon and an unnamed pteranodontian.

The holotype locality of Acheroraptor comes from a non-marine site preserving a diverse array of macro and microvertebrate taxa, giving an insight into the paleobiology of the Hell Creek Formation. Macrofossil taxa are represented by the dinosaurs Sphaerotholus buchholtzae and Pachycephalosaurus (pachycephalosaurid ornithischians), Anzu (a caenagnathid theropod), and Acheroraptor itself, and the crocodylian Borealosuchus. Isolated teeth from hadrosaurids, ceratopsids, tyrannosaurids, oviraptorosaurs, dromaeosaurids, and troodontids were found too, though their identities are indeterminate beyond the family level. As for microfossil taxa, a variety of freshwater fish including the guitarfish Myledaphus and indeterminate sturgeons, gars, holosteans and amiids are represented. Additionally, amphibians such as the salamander Scapherpeton and an indeterminate frog as well as the turtle Basilemys and indeterminate baenid, chelydrid, and adocid turtles are known.

=== Fauna ===
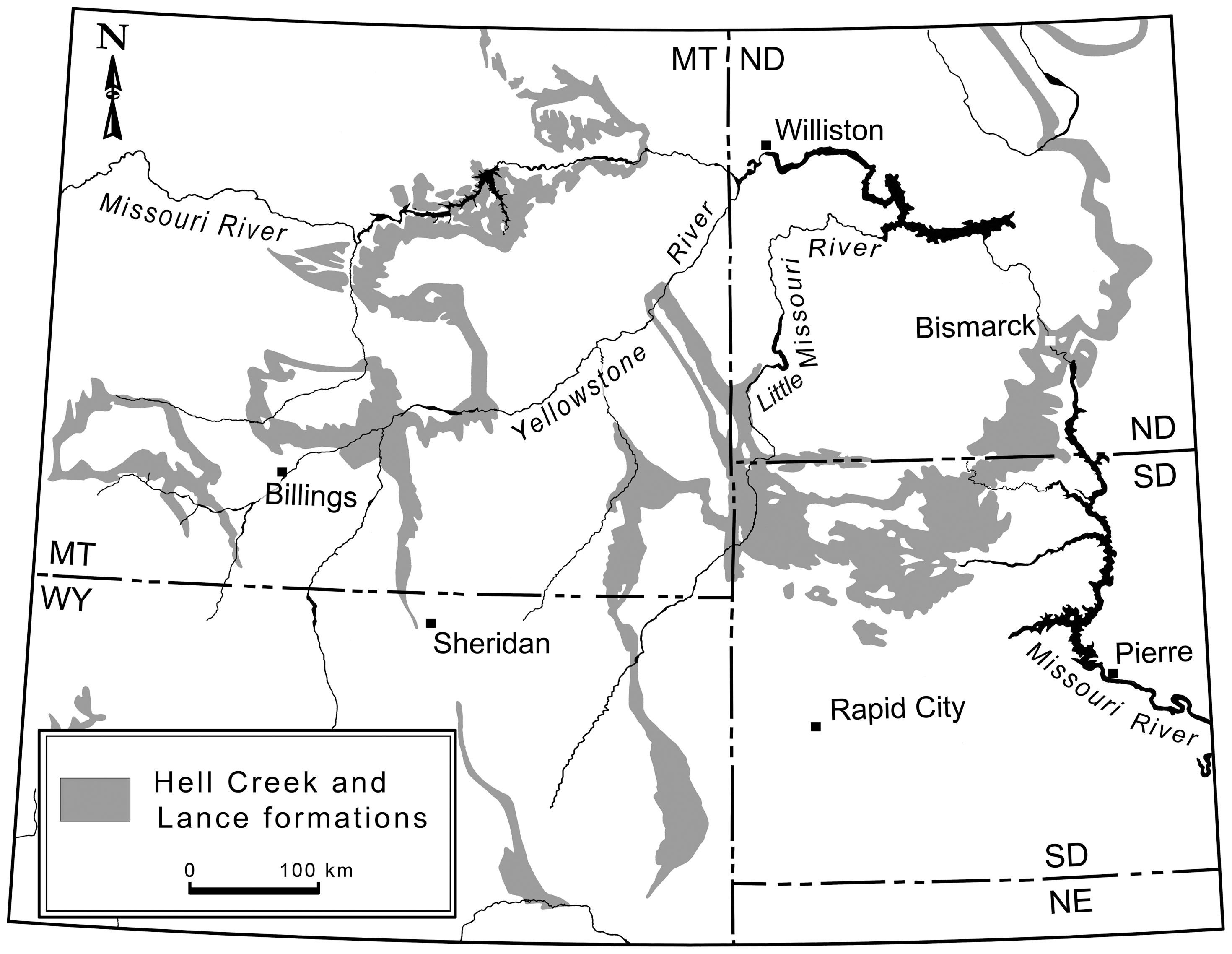
A map of the Hell Creek and Lance Formations, with Acheroraptor known from the former

Acheroraptor is also known from the Ferris Formation based on various teeth fossils, some of which were from the K-Pg boundary zone. It is one of the geologically youngest dromaeosaurids known, along with taxa like Dineobellator and Dakotaraptor. Evans, Larson, and Currie (2013) concluded that Acheroraptor was the only dromaeosaurid from the Hell Creek Formation, and that teeth previously referred to Dromaeosaurus and Saurornitholestes actually came from the taxon. Furthermore, the authors concluded that there was probably only one dromaeosaurid in the Hell Creek-Lance assemblage. In 2015, this view was disproven, with the description of Dakotaraptor, a far larger second dromaeosaur from the formation. However, the validity of this taxon is uncertain; its material is likely chimeric, including bones from turtles, oviraptorosaurs, and ornithomimids.

The Hell Creek Formation is divided into two layers; upper and lower. Although initially thought to come from the former, a 2020 abstract suggests Acheroraptor came from the latter. The fauna and flora of these layers differ, with some species such as Triceratops horridus only coming from the lower layer whereas T. prorsus derives from the upper layer. Non-dromaeosaurid theropods known from the formation include the tyrannosauroids Tyrannosaurus and Nanotyrannus, the alvarezsaurid Trierarchuncus, the oviraptorosaurs Anzu, Leptorhynchos, Eoneophron, and a large, undescribed Gigantoraptor-like ichnotaxon, the ornithomimids Struthiomimus, "Orcomimus", and Ornithomimus, the troodontids Paronychodon, Troodon, Pectinodon, and Richardoestesia, and birds like Avisaurus, Magnusavis, and Potamornis.

In addition to theropod dinosaurs, ornithischians are represented by members of Ankylosauria, Ceratopsia, Pachycephalosauridae, and Ornithopoda. Fossils of the large, armored ankylosaurians Ankylosaurus and Denversaurus in addition to those of horned ceratopsians like Leptoceratops, Triceratops, Torosaurus, and the potentially valid Tatankaceratops and Nedoceratops. Fossils of the thescelosaurid Thescelosaurus and hadrosaurid Edmontosaurus, members of Ornithopoda, are also known. The unique, "bone-headed" pachycephalosaurids are known by a menagerie of genera, such as Pachycephalosaurus, Platytholus, Sphaerotholus, and the possibly valid Stygimoloch.

== See also ==
- Timeline of dromaeosaurid research
