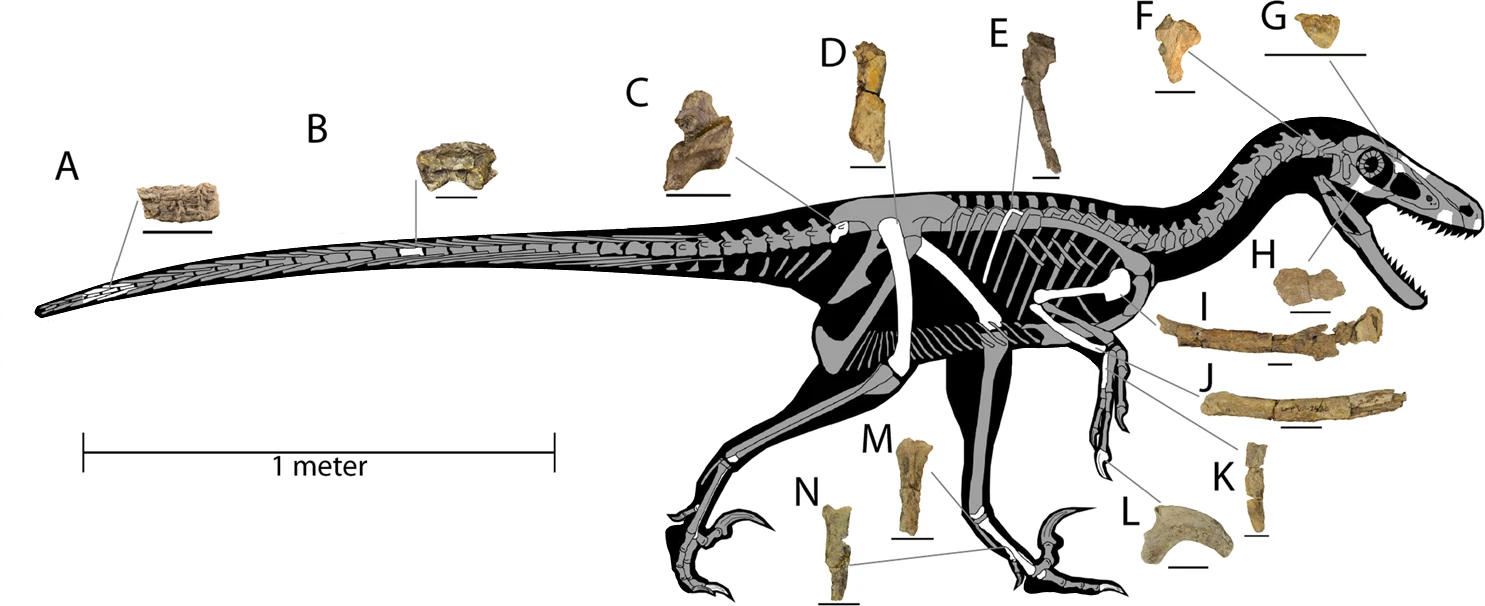
- Skeleton reconstruction, featuring the known elements in white

Scientific classification
- Kingdom: Animalia
- Phylum: Chordata
- Class: Reptilia
- Clade: Dinosauria
- Clade: Saurischia
- Clade: Theropoda
- Family: †Dromaeosauridae
- Clade: †Eudromaeosauria
- Genus: †Dineobellator; Jasinski et al. 2020

Type species
- †Dineobellator notohesperus Jasinski et al. 2020

= Dineobellator =

Dineobellator Temporal range: Late Cretaceous, Maastrichtian

Extinct genus of dinosaurs

Dineobellator (meaning Diné warrior, pronounced /dɪˌneɪoʊbəˈleɪtər/) is a genus of dromaeosaurid theropod dinosaur from the Late Cretaceous (Maastrichtian age) Ojo Alamo Formation (Naashoibito Member) of New Mexico, United States. The genus contains a single species, Dineobellator notohesperus, known from a partial skeleton.

== Discovery and naming ==
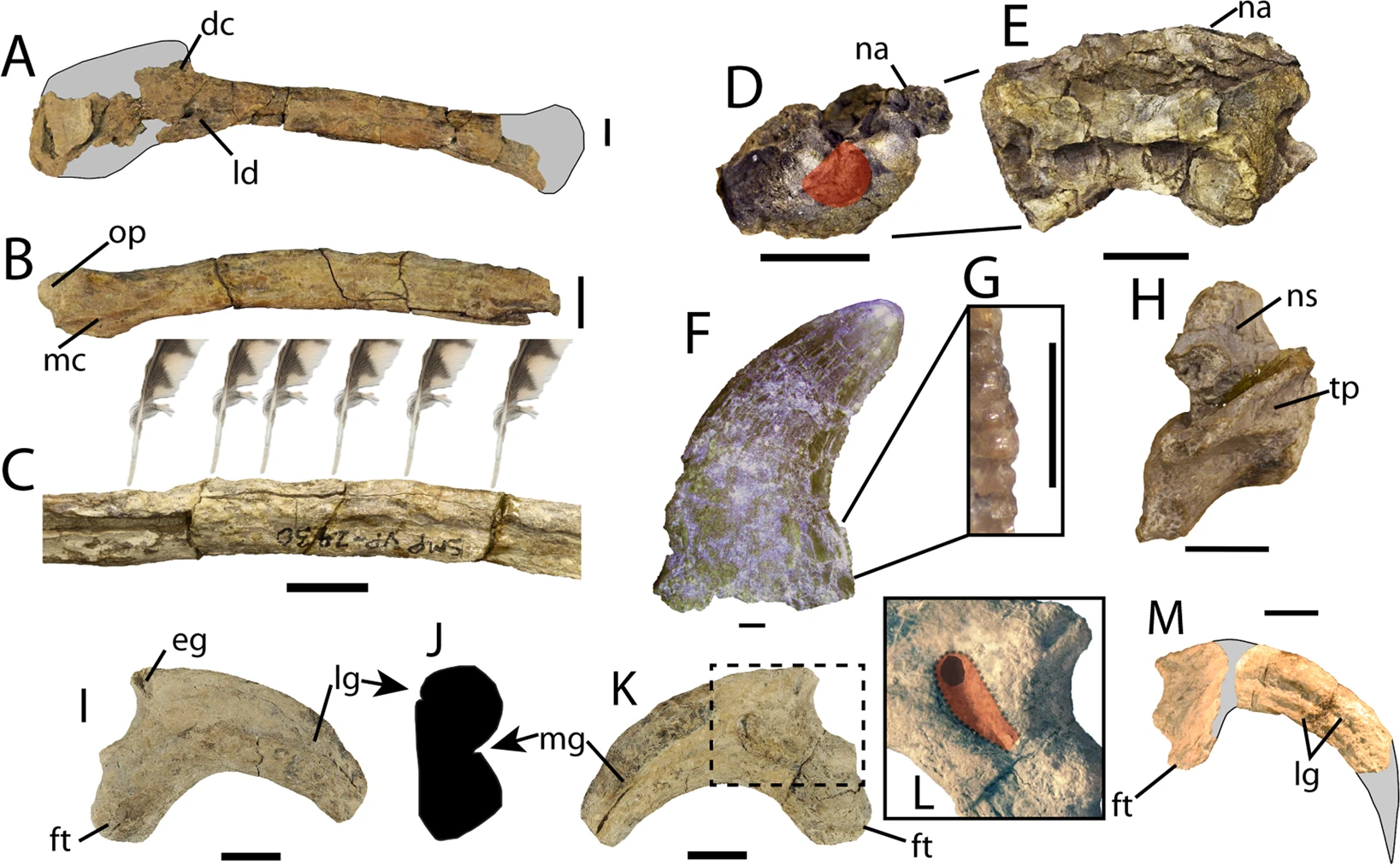
Diagnostic bones

The holotype remains are designated SMP VP-2430 and were first recovered in 2008 from the Ojo Alamo Formation by Robert M. Sullivan, Steven E. Jasinski and James Nikas. Sullivan and Jasinski collected additional material in 2009. In 2011, the find was reported in the scientific literature. Further excavations were performed by Jasinski in 2015 and 2016.

The remains were realized as belonging to a new taxon, which was only named and described in 2020, by Jasinski, Sullivan and Peter Dodson. It was given the species name Dineobellator notohesperus; the generic name is derived from Diné, the Navajo word used for the people of the Navajo Nation, and bellator, the Latin word for warrior. The specific name is derived from the Greek noto~ (νότος) for southern or south, and hesperis (Ἑσπερίς), meaning western, together "southwest", in reference to the American Southwest.

== Description ==
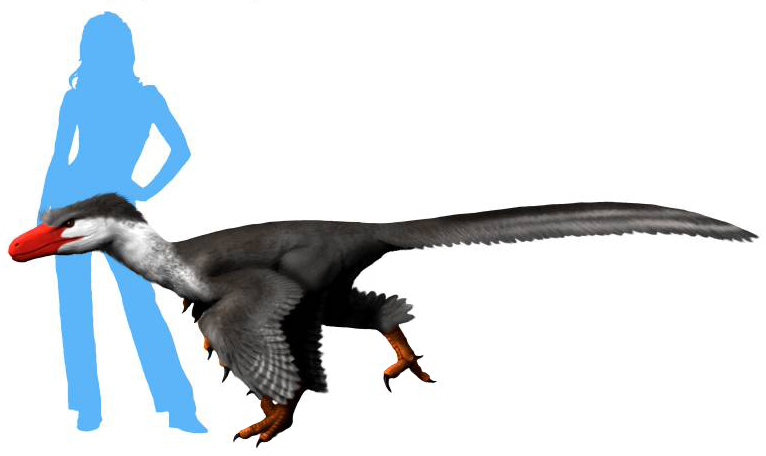
Life restoration by Nobu Tamura

Dineobellator was a dromaeosaur originally thought to have been similar in size to Velociraptor and Saurornitholestes, but reexaminations of the holotype suggest that it was about the size of Deinonychus based on similar dimensions of the humerus. Unique features of the skeleton suggest greater hand and feet flexion than normal for dromaeosaurs, a tighter grip strength in the manual unguals, and greater movement at the tail base. These may aid in agility and predation. Additionally, the presence of quill knobs on the ulna suggest it was feathered, as assumed for all dromaeosaurids.

== Classification ==
In their 2020 phylogenetic analysis, Jasinski et al. recovered Dineobellator in the Velociraptorinae. In a 2022 reexamination of the holotype, Jasinski et al. instead recovered Dineobellator as a member of the Eudromaeosauria, outside of the Velociraptorinae, Saurornitholestinae and Dromaeosaurinae. These results are displayed in the cladogram below:

- Dromaeosauridae
  - Halszkaraptor
  - - Microraptorinae
      - Shanag
      - Sinornithosaurus
    - - Tianyuraptor
      - Zhenyuanlong
      - Unenlagiinae
        - Austroraptor
        - - Buitreraptor
          - Unenlagia
      - Eudromaeosauria
        - Dineobellator
        - Dromaeosaurinae
          - Utahraptor
          - - Achillobator
            - Dromaeosaurus
        - Velociraptorinae
          - Adasaurus
          - Velociraptor mongoliensis
          - Velociraptor osmolskae
          - - Linheraptor
            - Tsaagan
        - Saurornitholestinae
          - Deinonychus
          - - - Bambiraptor
              - Saurornitholestes
            - - Acheroraptor
              - Atrociraptor

== Paleobiology ==
One of the claws on the right hand of the type specimen of Dineobellator bears a gouge, the size of which is consistent with the claws of a similarly-sized theropod, possibly another Dineobellator. No evidence of healing is present, suggesting that the injury occurred close to the time of death. A broken and re-healed rib was also documented in the specimen.

== Palaeoenvironment ==
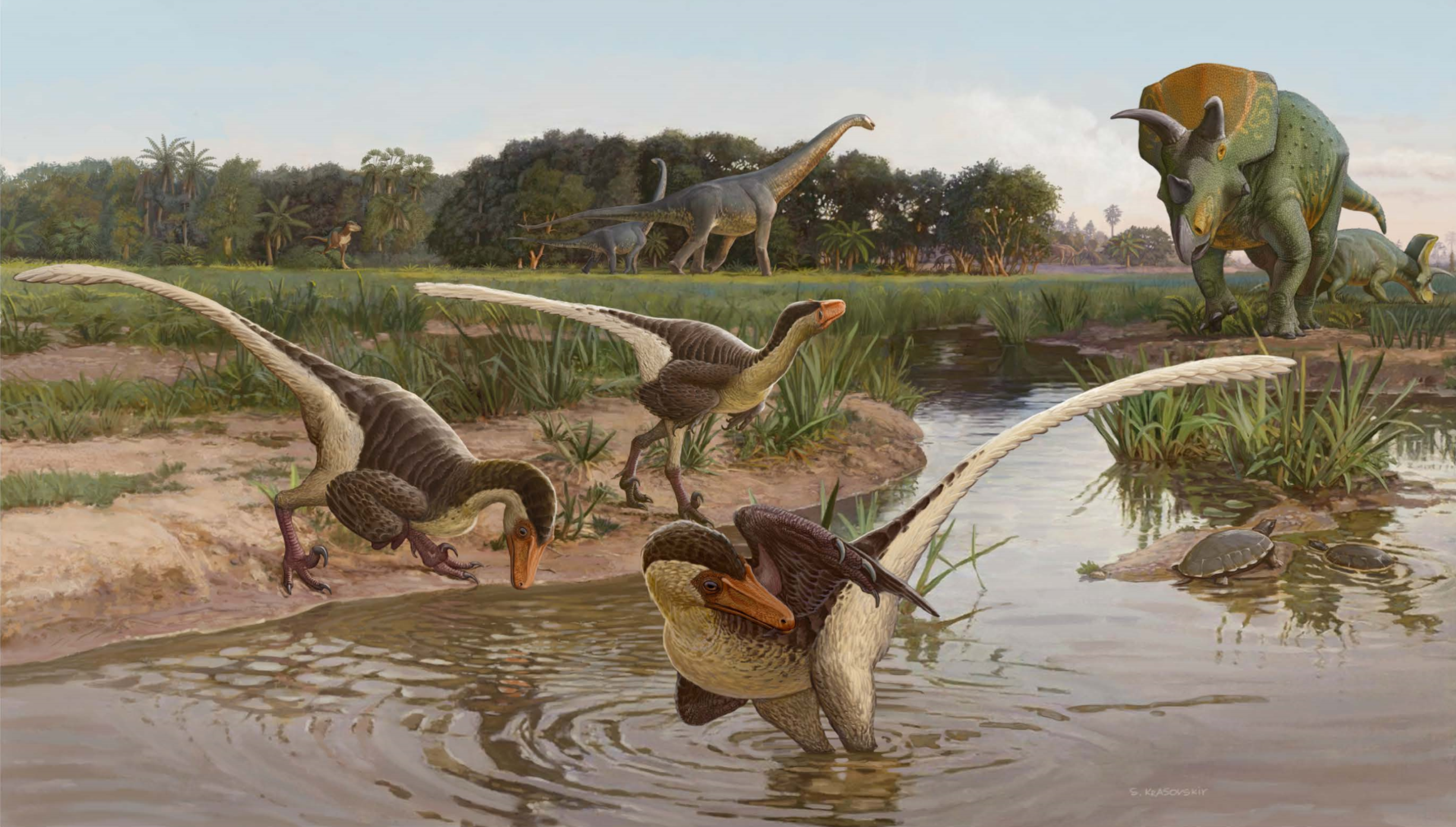
Restoration of Dineobellator in its ecosystem

Dineobellator is part of the Ojo Alamo Formation fauna in southern Laramidia, at the time a lush floodplain dominated by wetlands and riparian gymnosperm forests. It lived among alongside large dinosaurs like ceratopsians (Ojoceratops and Torosaurus), hadrosaurs (Edmontosaurus and Kritosaurus), two types of ankylosaur (including nodosaurid Glyptodontopelta), and the titanosaur Alamosaurus; smaller herbivorous and omnivorous dinosaurs in the ecosystem as of yet not known from any remains likely included thescelosaurine ornithopods like Thescelosaurus and pachycephalosaurs like Pachycephalosaurus. The top predators of the formation's ecosystem were the azhdarchid pterosaur Quetzalcoatlus and Tyrannosaurus. The presence of a dromaeosaur suggests that the dromaeosaurs were active predators that had discrete ecological niches even in the presence of large tyrannosaurs. Other theropods Dineobellator co-existed with were the caenagnathid Ojoraptorsaurus, ornithomimids, and troodontids, as well as Richardoestesia of uncertain affinity. Meanwhile, there are at least eight remains of mammals from the formation, such as Alphadon, Essonodon, Mesodma, and Meniscoessus, while there are five (possibly seven) types of turtle remains (Aspideretoides, Compsemys, Hoplochelys, Neurankylus, Plastomenus, and possibly Adocus and Basilemys), and four remains of fish (including Myledaphus, Squatirhina, and possibly Lepisosteus) all of which could be inferred to be common prey items for Dineobellator.
