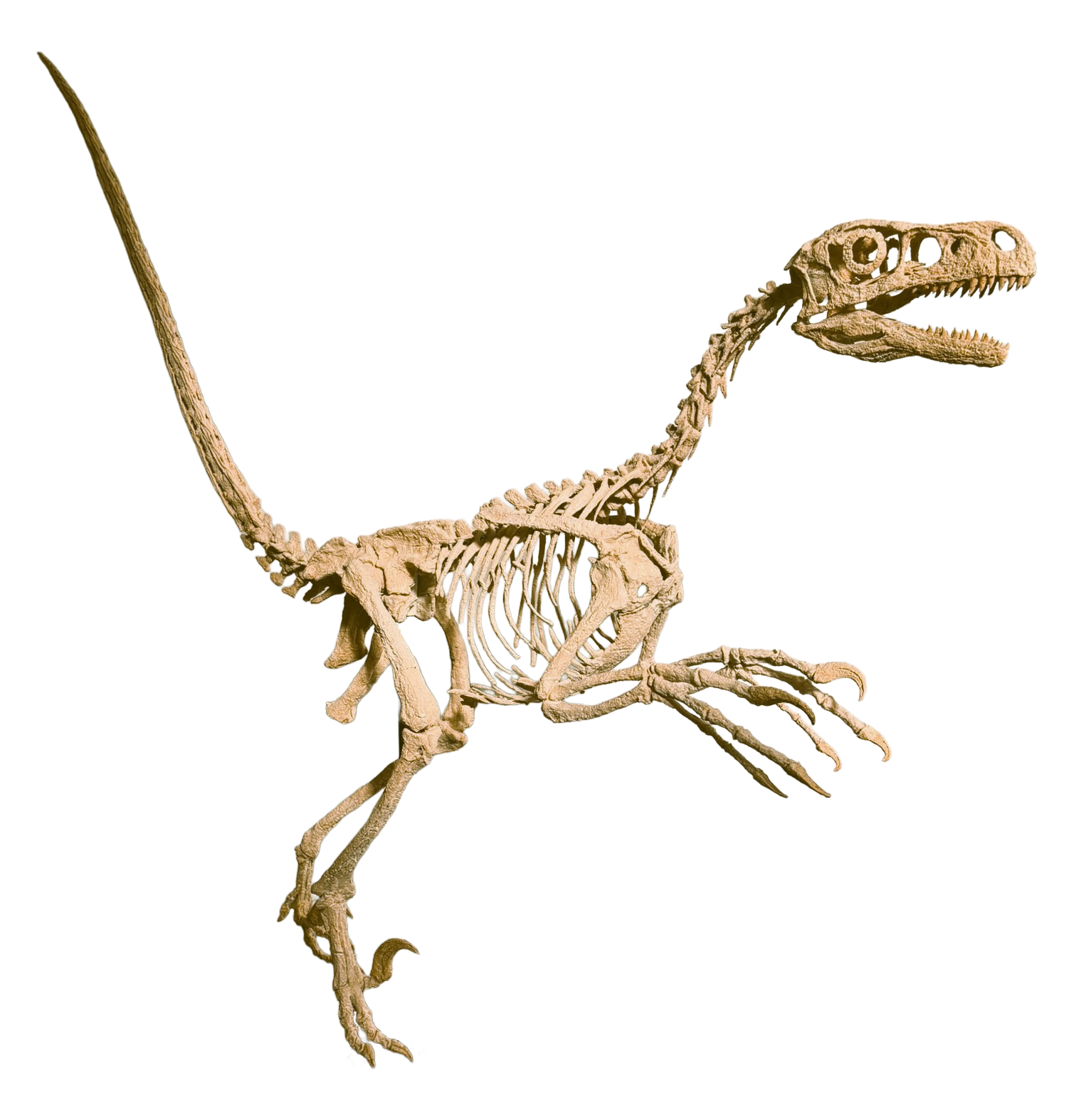
- Reconstructed model skeleton of S. rapax

Scientific classification
- Kingdom: Animalia
- Phylum: Chordata
- Class: Reptilia
- Clade: Dinosauria
- Clade: Saurischia
- Clade: Theropoda
- Family: †Dromaeosauridae
- Clade: †Eudromaeosauria
- Subfamily: †Velociraptorinae
- Genus: †Shri; Turner et al., 2021

Type species
- †Shri devi Turner et al., 2021

Other species
- †S. rapax Moutrille et al., 2025

= Shri (genus) =

Shri Temporal range: Late Cretaceous, ~Campanian–Maastrichtian

Extinct genus of dromaeosaurid dinosaurs

Shri (named after Palden Lhamo, a Buddhist deity) is an extinct genus of small dromaeosaurid dinosaurs that lived in what is now Mongolia during the Late Cretaceous. The genus contains two species; the first, Shri devi, was described in 2021 by Alan H. Turner and colleagues based on a partial postcranial skeleton from the Barun Goyot Formation. A second specimen, including a partial skull and hindlimb, was later referred to this species. The second species, Shri rapax, was described in 2025 by Léa Moutrille and colleagues based on a nearly complete skeleton including a skull (though the skull has subsequently been lost) from the Djadokhta Formation.

== History ==
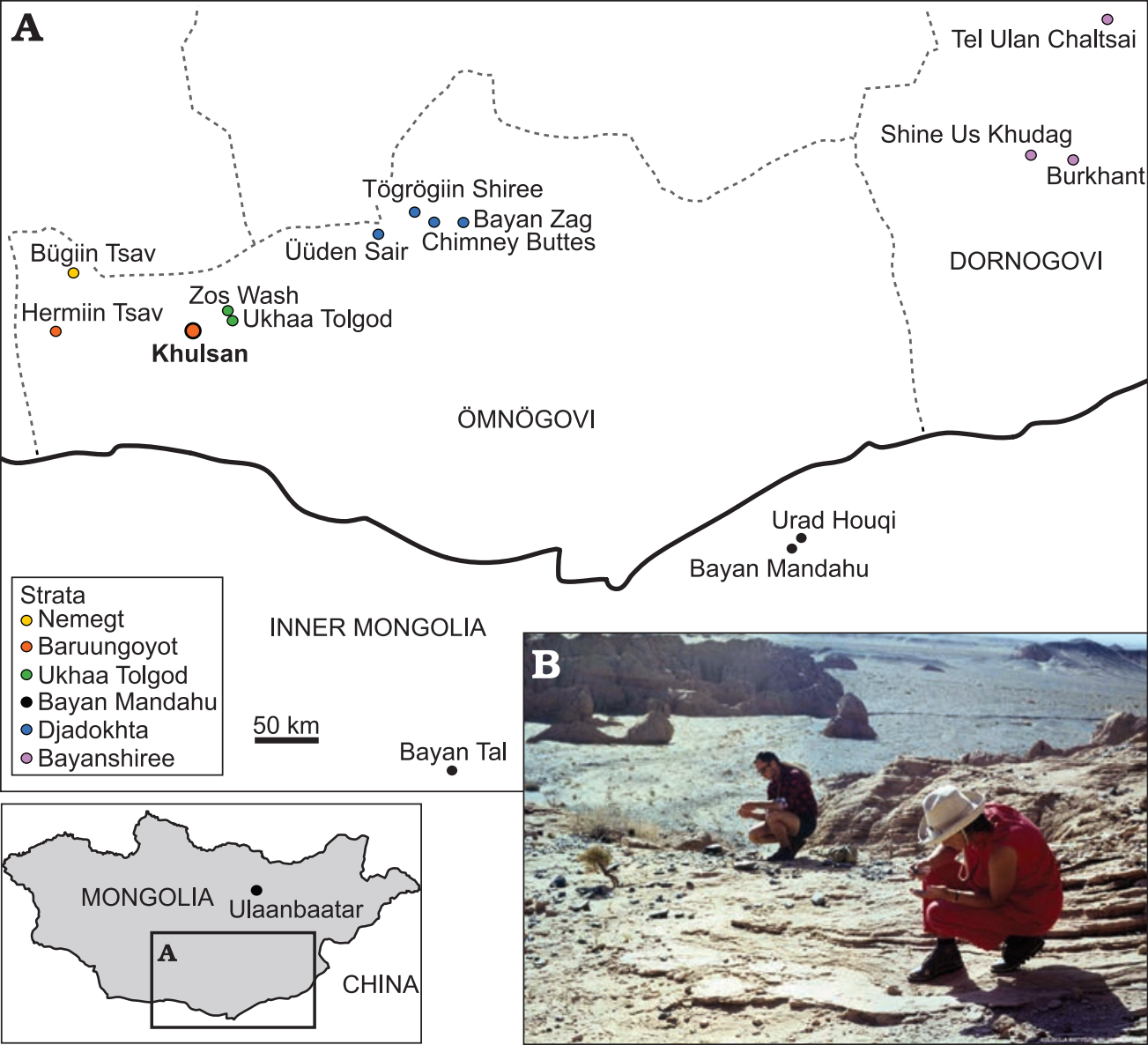
Map and locality of specimens referred to Shri devi, at Khulsan

The holotype specimen of Shri devi, the type species of the genus Shri, is IGM 100/980. This specimen was discovered on 5 July 1991 by Mark Norell. It was nicknamed "Ichabodcraniosaurus" by Norell, as mentioned by Novacek (1996), after Ichabod Crane, a fictional character haunted by a headless ghost, because it lacked the skull. In 1999 it was provisionally considered a specimen of Velociraptor mongoliensis. It consists of a partially articulated individual that preserves the right hindlimb, the left tibiotarsus, as well as the pelvis and a series of cervical, dorsal, sacral and caudal vertebrae.

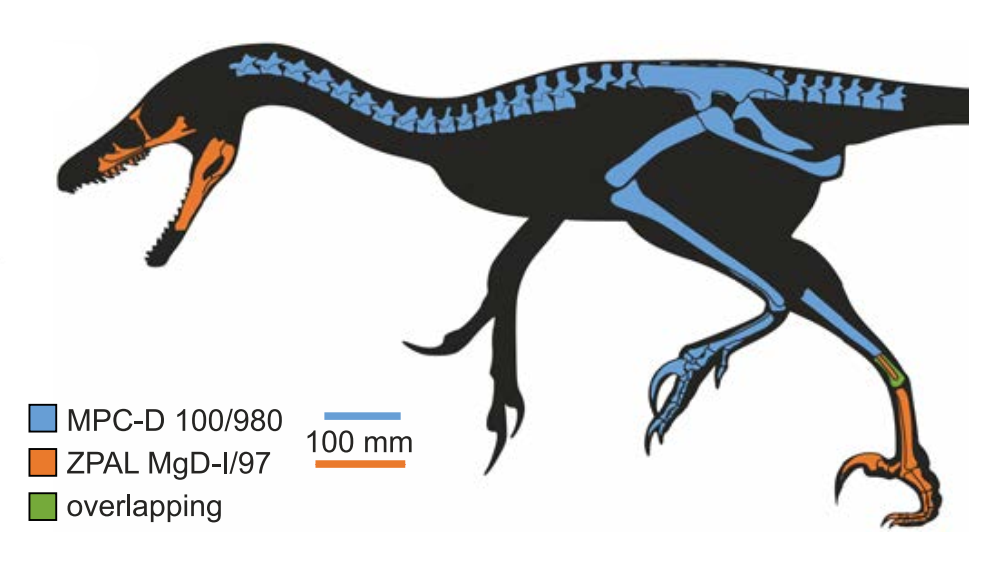
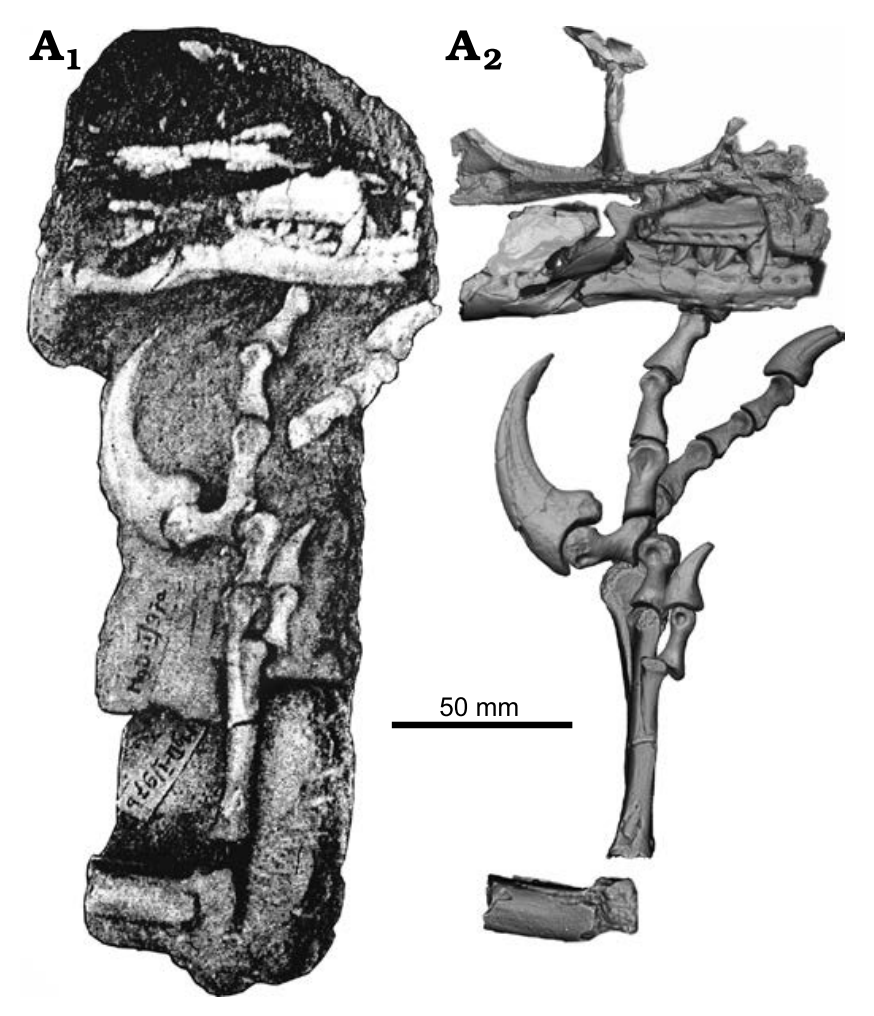
Reconstructed skeleton of S. devi including the holotype (blue) and referred specimen (orange, fossil specimen at right)

In 2023, Polish paleontologist Łukasz Czepiński referred a new specimen to the genus, ZPAL MgD-I/97, represented by a partial skull and left hindlimb. It was recovered from the Khulsan locality of the Barun Goyot Formation in 1970 during the Polish-Mongolian Paleontological Expeditions and initially assigned to Velociraptor. Further examinations by Czepiński concluded it to represent an additional specimen of Shri based on pes (foot) morphology.

In 2025, French researcher Léa Moutrille and colleagues described Shri rapax as a second species in the genus based on an articulated, nearly complete skeleton likely collected from the Djadokhta Formation (Ukhaa Tolgod locality). The specimen was illegally poached at some time prior to 2010 and subsequently held in private Japanese and English collections. Eldonia, a French company, later obtained it, and in 2016, the skull and first four articulated cervical (neck) vertebrae were taken to be scanned at the Royal Belgian Institute of Natural Sciences. As of the description of the specimen in 2025, the whereabouts of this material is unknown and presumed lost. Later negotiations allowed the specimen to be repatriated and returned to the Institute of Paleontology of the Mongolian Academy of Sciences. The remainder of the specimen, now catalogued as MPC-D 102/117, comprises most of the vertebral column (neck, back, sacrum, and tail) with associated ribs, both sternal plates, a full set of gastralia, the left scapula, both coracoids, the furcula, the full right forelimb and manus, a complete pelvis (including right and left parts), and part of both femora. The specific name, rapax, is derived from a Latin word meaning "rapacious", referencing the enlarged, sickle-shaped claw on the first digit of the hand.

== Description ==
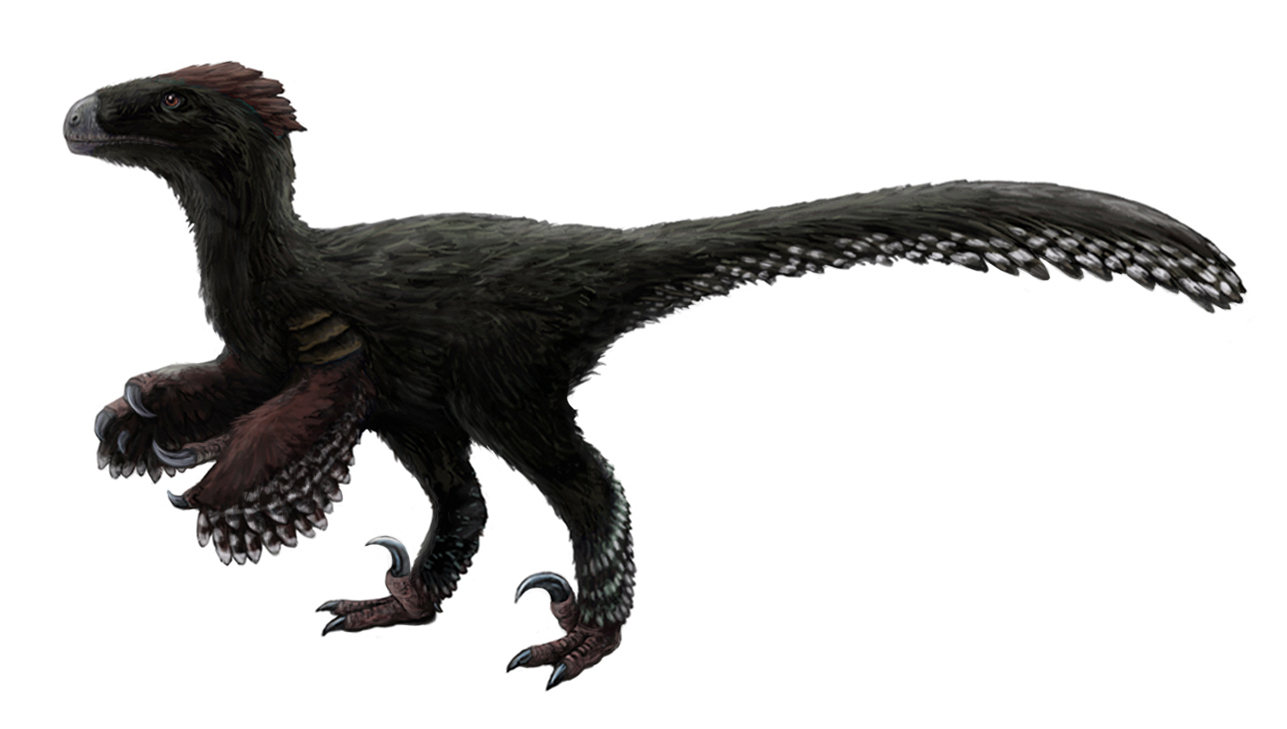
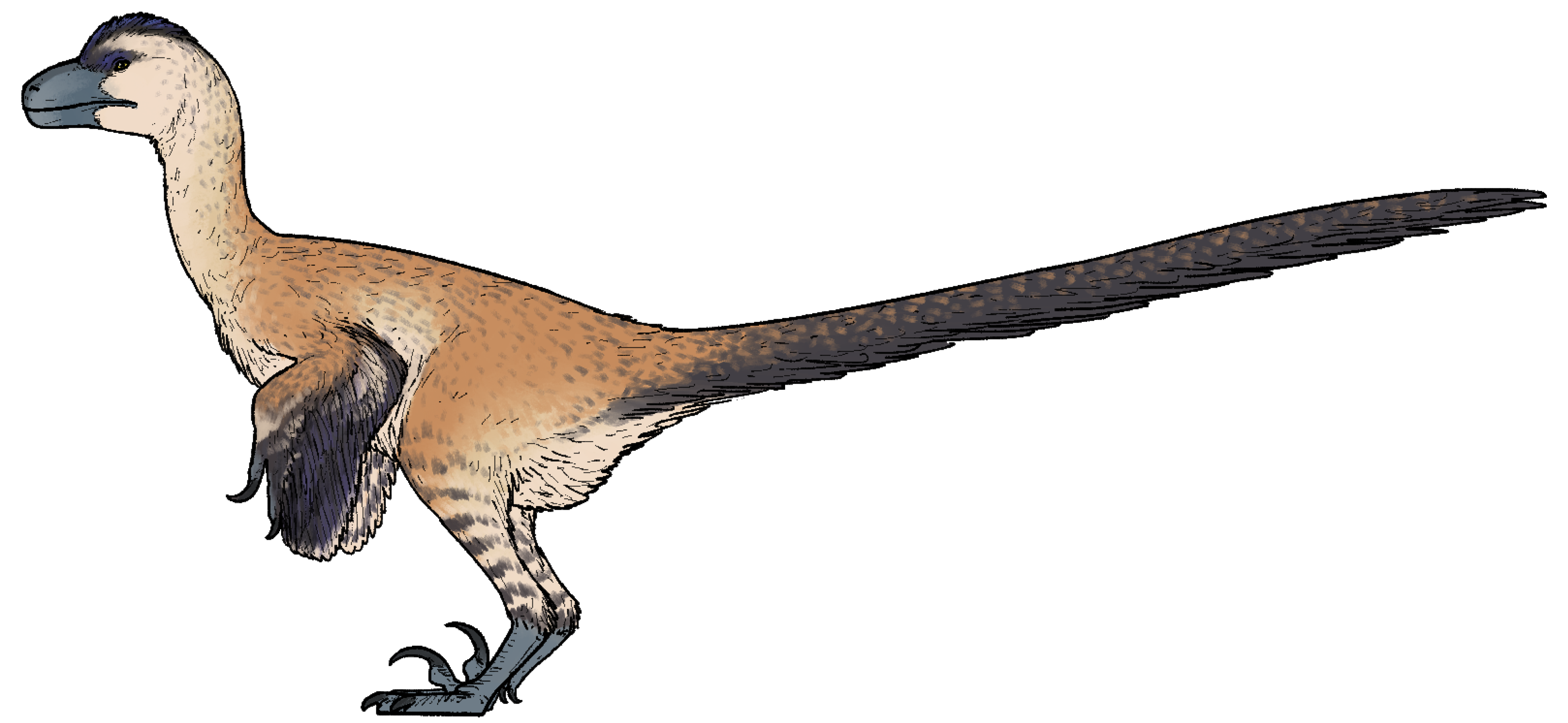
Speculative life restorations of S. devi (top) and S. rapax (bottom)

Shri was mostly similar to Velociraptor mongoliensis in having a weak fourth trochanter, this is however, also shared with all other dromaeosaurids, and deep anterior pedicular fossae in the cervical vertebrae. Another distinguishing trait of Shri is that its epipophyses in the last four cervicals are not raised but instead are represented by rugose circular scars.

== Classification ==
In their 2021 description of Shri devi, Turner and colleagues scored it in the "Theropod Working Group matrix" to test its phylogenetic relationships within the Dromaeosauridae. It was found to be the sister taxon to Velociraptor mongoliensis based on the presence of a distinct ambiens tubercle that is located proximally on the anterior face of the pubis, a well-developed anterior tuberosity located high on the ischium, as well as a rounded ischial ridge that runs lengthwise.

In their 2025 description of Shri rapax, Moutrille et al. similarly recovered Shri as the sister taxon to Velociraptor mongoliensis within the Velociraptorinae. These results were obtained using the comprehensive theropod-focused phylogenetic matrix of Andrea Cau (2024), who contributed to the description of S. rapax. A cladogram based on these results is displayed below:

- Eudromaeosauria
  - Dromaeosaurinae
  - Velociraptorinae
    - - Adasaurus
      - Kuru
      - Luanchuanraptor
      - Yurgovuchia
    - - - Velociraptor osmolskae
        - - Tsaagan
          - Linheraptor
      - - Velociraptor mongoliensis
        - - Shri devi
          - Shri rapax

== Paleobiology ==
In their 2025 description of Shri rapax, Moutrille et al. proposed that this taxon had a stronger bite force than Velociraptor based on the proportionally stouter and shorter snout, more caudally extended tooth row, and interdigitated jugal-maxillary suture. The hands of this species also bore a proportionally larger pollex ungual (claw on the first digit of the hand) than in other velociraptorines. These factors suggest niche partitioning between closely related dromaeosaurids in the Djadokhta Formation.
