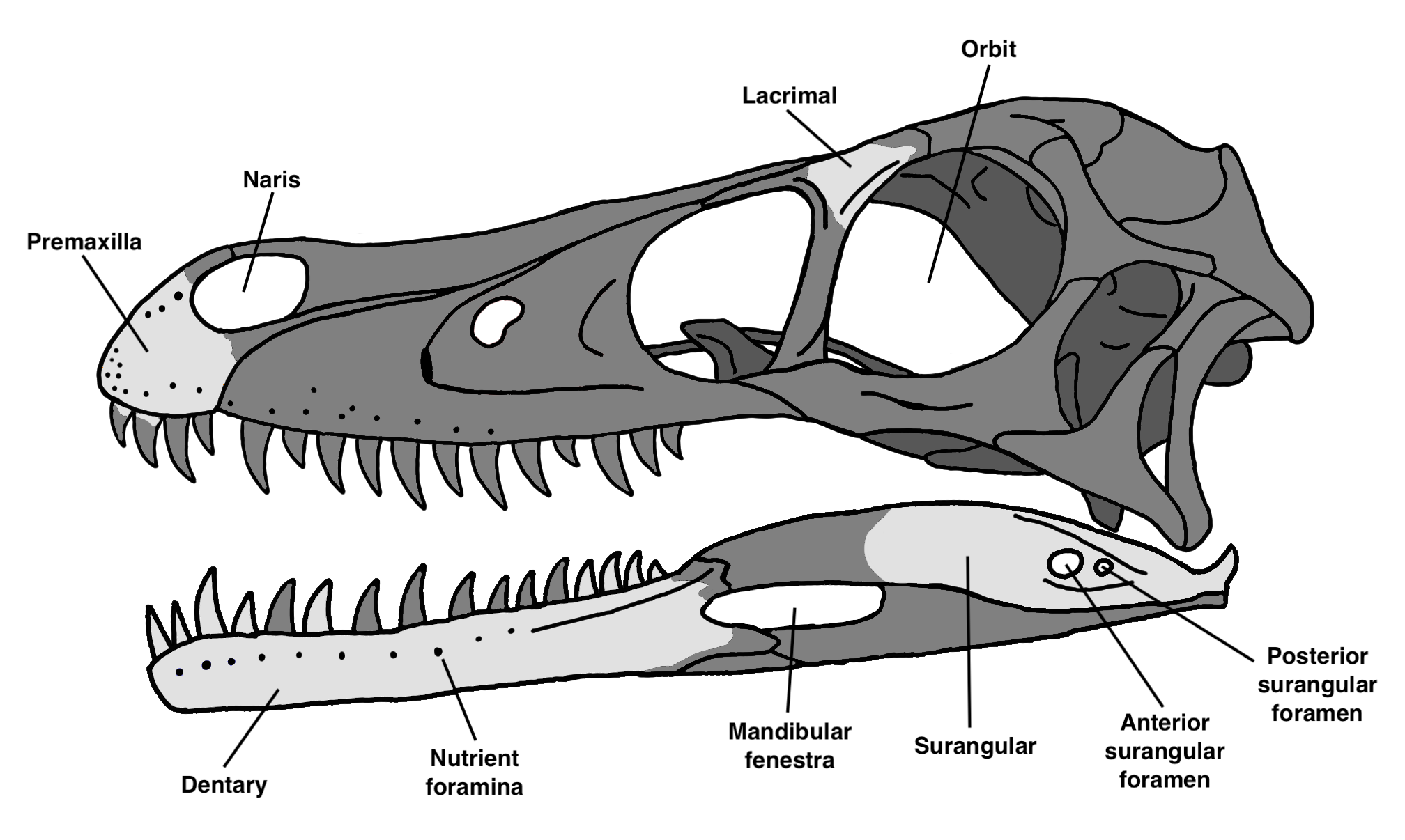
- Diagram of known skull material from the holotype (unknown material in dark grey)

Scientific classification
- Kingdom: Animalia
- Phylum: Chordata
- Class: Reptilia
- Clade: Dinosauria
- Clade: Saurischia
- Clade: Theropoda
- Clade: Paraves
- Family: †Dromaeosauridae
- Clade: †Eudromaeosauria
- Subfamily: †Velociraptorinae
- Genus: †Kuru; Napoli et al., 2021

Type species
- †Kuru kulla Napoli et al., 2021

Synonyms
- "Airakoraptor" (nomen nudum)

= Kuru kulla =

Kuru Temporal range: Late Cretaceous (Maastrichtian), 72–71 Ma

Genus of dromaeosaurid dinosaurs

Kuru kulla (/ˈkuruˈkʊlə/, after Kurukullā, a Tibetan Buddhist deity) is an extinct species of dromaeosaurid theropod dinosaurs from the Late Cretaceous Barun Goyot Formation of Mongolia. K. kulla is the only species in the genus Kuru, known from a fragmentary skeleton including a partial skull.

== Discovery and naming ==
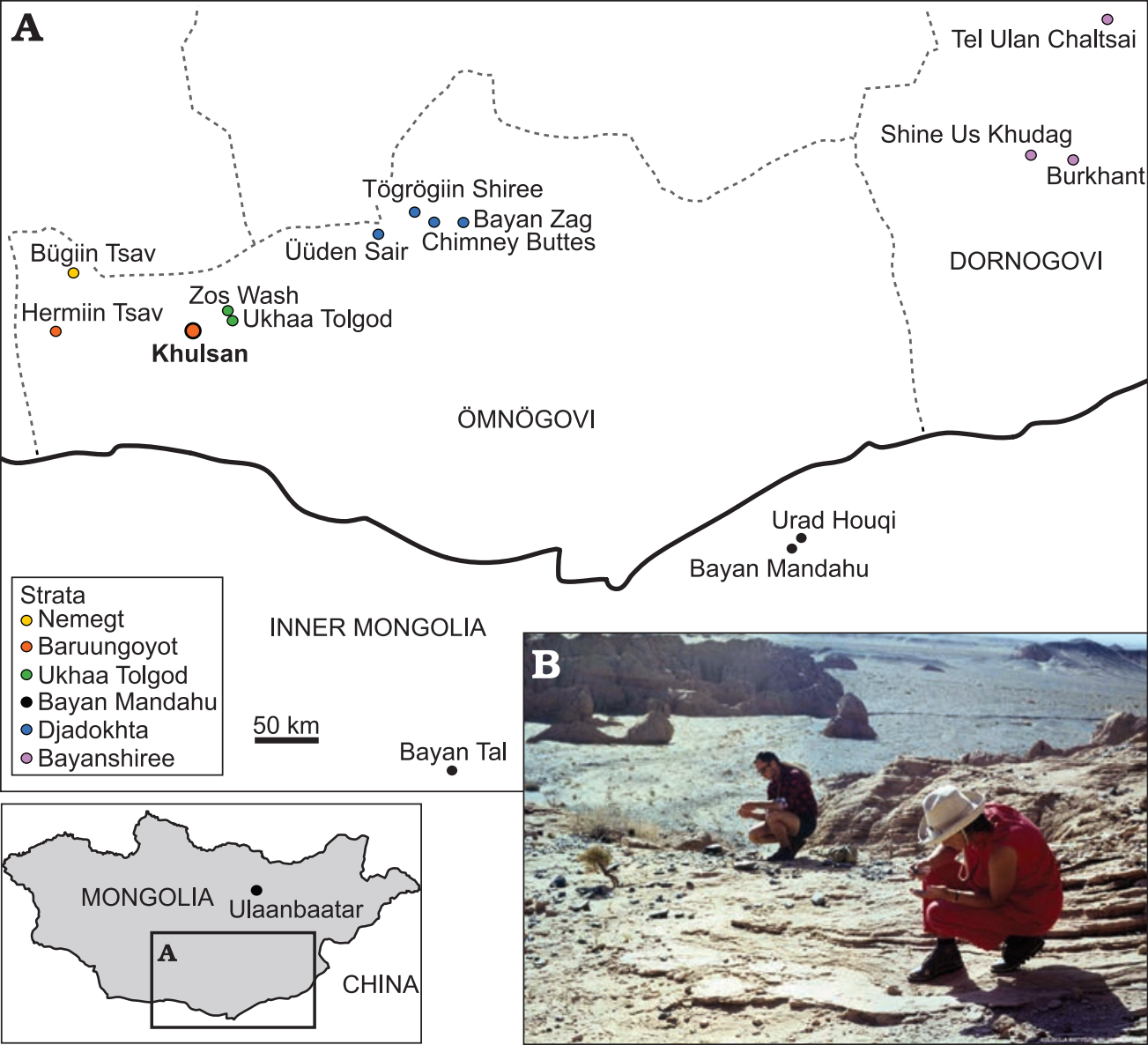
A map of the Khulsan locality with a photo of some paleontologists at the site

The holotype of Kuru kulla was discovered by an American-Mongolian expedition at Khulsan in the Gobi Desert, Mongolia, on 5 July 1991 a few hours before the discovery of the holotype of the related taxon Shri devi, and was reposited at the Institute of Geology at the Mongolian Academy of Sciences in Ulaanbaatar. The specimen was given the designation IGM 100/981 and consists of a fragmentary skeleton including a right premaxillary bone, the right lacrimal bone, a partial right dentary, the right surangular bone, 14 presacral vertebrae, three caudal vertebrae, fragments of both upper limb bones, a fragmentary ilium, distal ends of both pubes, both femora, a right tibia, and fragments of the right and left feet. The quality of the preservation was inconsistent when the specimen was fossilized, and it is generally poorly preserved when compared to the remains of the contemporaneous Shri devi.

In 1992, the holotype was reported as a distinct dromaeosaurid taxon at a Society of Vertebrate Paleontology conference in Toronto, Canada. In their paper describing the large dromaeosaurid Achillobator, Perle and colleagues listed a bibliographic entry titled "Morphology of a Dromaeosaurian dinosaur - Airakoraptor from the Upper Cretaceous of Mongolia". However, this bibliographic entry is believed to be an error as no such paper is known to exist and it is probably a reference to an unpublished work or an abstract from a conference. This would mean the name "Airakoraptor" is a nomen nudum and is therefore invalid. Napoli and colleagues, in their formal description of Kuru, presume that the name "Airakoraptor" means "Kumis thief", after kumis, also known as "airag" or "airak", a donkey-milk product made in Central Asia. In their description, Napoli and colleagues also explicitly state that the naming of Kuru is not a reference to the disease of the same name.

In 2006, its surangular bone was described in the paper which named the dromaeosaurid Tsaagan. However, later that year, this specimen was confused with the so-called "Zos Wash specimen" found in 1998, which was catalogued under the number IGM 100/3503 and referred to the genus Velociraptor. The holotype was formally described and named in 2021 by James G. Napoli, Alexander A. Ruebenstahl, Bhart-Anjan S. Bhullar, Alan H. Turner, and Mark A. Norell.

== Description ==
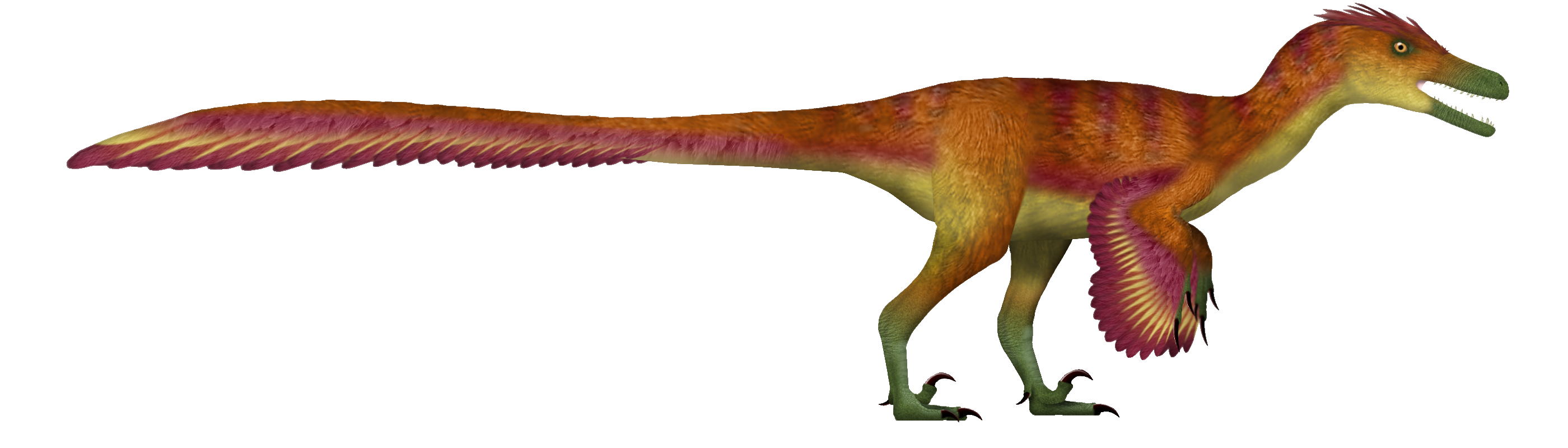
Life restoration of Kuru based on related taxa

Kuru is a small-bodied eudromaeosaur, similar in size to Velociraptor. The holotype specimen is known from an incomplete skeleton that is overall similar to other known eudromaeosaurs, indicating that in life it would have resembled its better-understood relatives like Velociraptor and Tsaagan. Napoli and colleagues distinguished Kuru from all other eudromaeosaurs by identifying several autapomorphies including: a deep groove in front of the anterior margin of the external naris, a small horn-like projection on the lacrimal bone, two foramina on the rear of the surangular bone, and pleurocoels on the dorsal vertebrae which are shifted forward compared to related taxa.

Napoli and colleagues in their description of the holotype note that the body proportions indicate that Kuru had a more robust skull than related eudromaeosaurs, but also had proportionally longer limbs and a reduced "killing claw" in its second toe. No study of its functional anatomy has been completed, but the authors hypothesize that these traits suggest slight ecological differences between Kuru and its closest relatives.

=== Skull ===
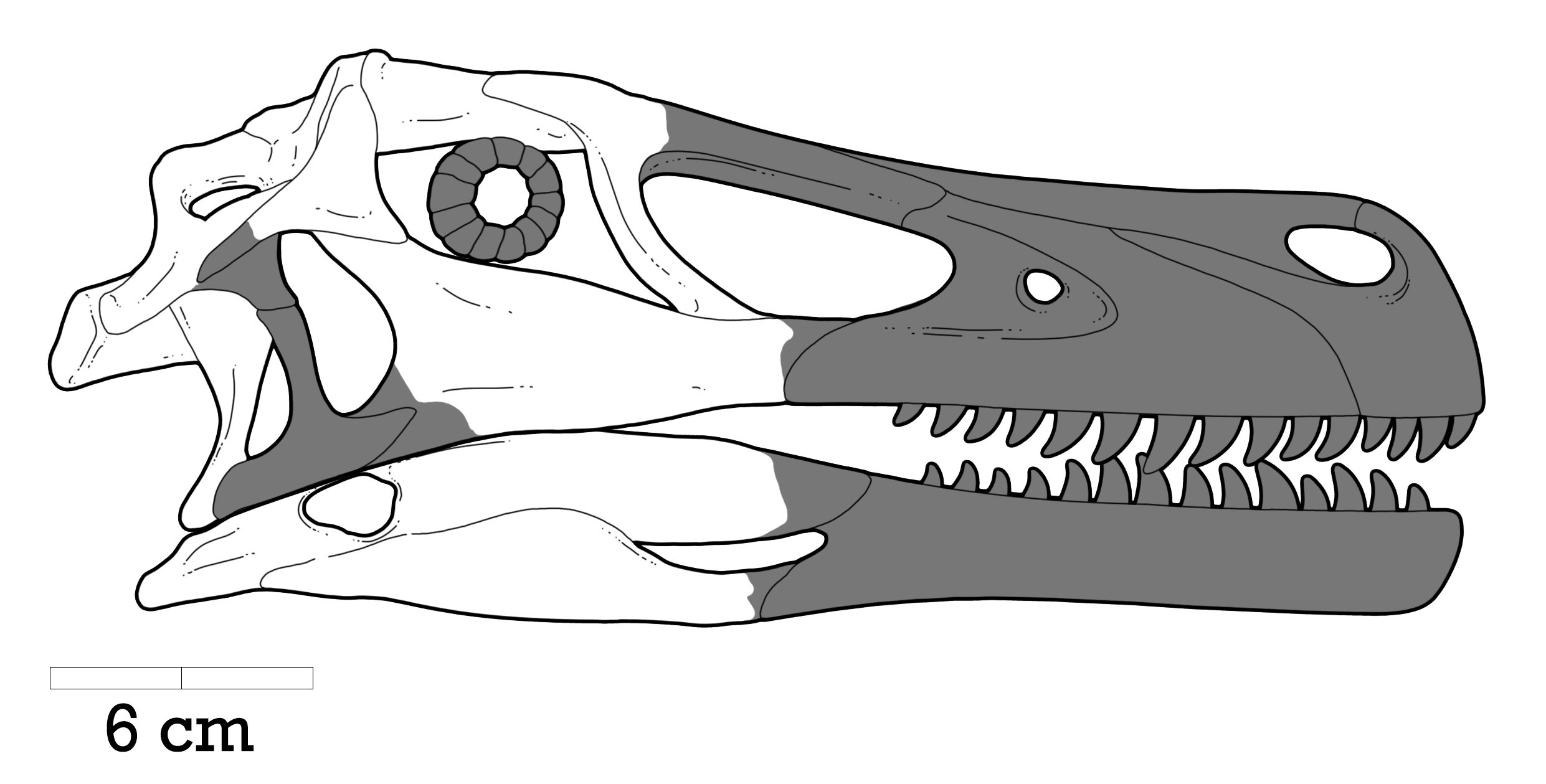
Reconstructed skull of the closely-related Adasaurus

The cranium is represented by the anterior part of the right premaxilla (in front of the nostril) and the posterior half of the right lacrimal bone. The premaxilla has only two dental alveoli preserved, but Napoli and colleagues stated that it likely had four premaxillary teeth, which is the condition seen in all toothed theropods. Several features on the surface of the bone are also preserved. The most prominent of these is a c-shaped groove which is anterior to the naris. A similar structure is present in the premaxillae of the related taxa Tsaagan and Linheraptor, but it is much less pronounced in these genera.

The lacrimal is only partially preserved, but based on the parts which are preserved it is inferred to have been t-shaped, like those of other dromaeosaurs. At the anterior end, the lacrimal's articular surface with the nasal bone is preserved and it forms a shelf-like protrusion which would have connected to the ventral side of the nasal in life. On its dorsal posterior side, there is a horn-like protrusion which borders the orbit. The dorsal side of this "hornlet" possessed a rugose surface, similar to those seen in other dromaeosaurs, although they are much more pronounced in Kuru. The lacrimal also preserved a deep excavation on its ventral side, which was interpreted by Napoli and colleagues to be the canal through which the nasolacrimal duct passed.

The mandible is represented by a nearly complete left dentary and surangular bone, but these bones were not preserved continuously and consist of several discrete pieces. There are also nine preserved dentary teeth and three isolated teeth that are either from the dentary or the maxilla. The dentary is straight along its length, unlike most other velociraptorines, and similar to Dromaeosaurus and Deinonychus. It preserved 14 (or possibly 15) tooth positions, which is much higher than the 11-12 typical of other dromaeosaurs, although it is similar to Saurornitholestes, which has a comparable number of dentary teeth. The teeth are ziphodont in shape (narrower along the mediolateral axis than the anteroposterior axis) and possess deep roots and serrations on the front and back edges, at least in the case of the teeth that are well-preserved enough to contain such details. However, they do not possess the enamel ridges on the sides of the teeth which are seen in some other dromaeosaurs. Notably, the third dentary tooth is highly elongated, forming a characteristic "fang" in the lower jaw which is much greater in length than the second or fourth dentary teeth. However, the fourth dentary alveolus is as large at the third, so Napoli and colleagues suggest that the fourth tooth of the type specimen was not fully erupted and may have been of a similar size as the third tooth when finished erupting.

The surangular is mostly complete and contains several diagnostic traits of the Kuru genus. Most notable among these are two foramina, rather than a single one. The prevalence of this trait in velociraptorines is ambiguous due to incompleteness and poor preservation in this area of the skull in Tsaagan and Linheraptor. Napoli and colleagues also comment that the putative tyrannosauroid Bagaraatan has two surangular foramina, but remark that the specimen may be a chimera and thus may offer limited comparative value. The surangular also exhibits a shelf that is inclined dorsally. This is the condition seen in Deinonychus, but differs from that of all other dromaeosaurs in which the same structure is inclined laterally.

=== Post-cranial skeleton ===
Numerous vertebrae are preserved with the holotype. Most of them are not continuous or articulated, and several of them only preserve the vertebral centra. Four cervical vertebrae, ten dorsal vertebrae, and three caudal vertebrae in total are preserved. The exact positions of the vertebrae in the spinal column is not known, but comparisons with the related taxa Tsaagan and Shri devi enabled Napoli and colleagues to give them tentative assignments. Some of the dorsal vertebrae were also incompletely prepared, and could only be observed and analyzed by the use of computer tomography. Although they are partial and fragmentary, the dorsal centra appear to decrease in length from the anterior to the posterior of the spine.

The forelimb of Kuru includes the distal ends of both humeri, a proximal fragment of the right humerus, the proximal end of the right ulna, the proximal and distal ends of the right radius, three left metacarpals articulated with the left semilunate carpal, several isolated phalanges, and two manual claws. The humerus preserves rugose elements along its length, which Napoli and colleagues interpret as muscle attachment sites. They also note that the ulna does not appear to preserve any quill knobs (as have been found in Velociraptor), although this is possibly a result of poor preservation. There is a ridge which extends distally from the coronoid process of the ulna, which is seen in the controversial genus Balaur. Kuru is also emblematic of pennaraptorans in that it exhibits a flattened expansion at the distal end of the radius. The bones of the hand do not appear to preserve any unique features that distinguish Kuru from any other dromaeosaurids.

The hind limb elements consist of the left postacetabular process and ischiadic peduncle of the ilium, the distal ends of both pubes, both femora, the proximal end of the left tibia, the three left metatarsals and two of the right metatarsals, the left astragalus, sixteen pedal phalanges including some from both feet, and four claws. The hind limbs are most similar to Velociraptor and Shri devi. All three taxa have an enlarged ridge on the lateral surface of the femur. The fourth trochanter is apparently absent in Kuru, but there is a ridge on the femur that is seemingly homologous with it.

== Classification ==
In their description of Kuru, Napoli and colleagues conducted a phylogenetic analysis using a wide variety of paravian taxa. The data set that they use is primarily drawn from the matrix used in the phylogenetic analysis conducted by Steve Brusatte and colleagues in 2014 with the addition of several taxa scored by Pei and colleagues in 2020. Napoli and colleagues adjusted some of the scores from these matrices for the taxa Adasaurus, Tsaagan, and Velociraptor based on independent observation.

In their analysis, they recovered Kuru as the sister taxon to Adasaurus, which is from the slightly younger Nemegt Formation. The uniting synapomorphies for these two taxa include a posterior surangular foramen that excavates 30% of the depth of the bone, an absence of the fourth trochanter, and thoracic centra that are longer than they are wide. Kuru also has a reduced "killing claw", similar to Adasaurus. An abbreviated version of their results, compiled from 100,000 of the most parsimonious trees, can be seen below.

- Eudromaeosauria
  - Saurornitholestes
  - - Bambiraptor
    - - Dromaeosaurinae
      - Velociraptorinae
        - - Linheraptor
          - Tsaagan
        - - Deinonychus
          - - - Adasaurus
              - Kuru
            - - Balaur
              - - Shri
                - Velociraptor

A more recent phylogeny including Kuru was published by Łukasz Czepiński in 2023 and accompanied his description of a skull assigned to the species Shri devi. In his publication, Czepiński replicated the analyses of Napoli and colleagues as well as of Powers and colleagues using the data sets they provided. Notably, Czepiński recovered Adasaurus outside the dromaeosaurine-velociraptorine-saurornitholestine split, rather than closely allied with Kuru within the Velociraptorinae.

In the phylogenetic analysis in their 2025 description of Shri rapax from the Djadokhta Formation, Moutrille and colleagues recovered Kuru in an unresolved velociraptorine polytomy including Adasaurus, Luanchuanraptor, and Yurgovuchia. These results were obtained using the comprehensive theropod-focused phylogenetic matrix of Andrea Cau (2024), who contributed to the description of S. rapax.

== Paleoecology ==
=== Diet ===
The diet and ecology of Kuru has not been thoroughly studied. However, multiple publications note the apparent occurrence of at least three distinct dromaeosaurs in the Barun Goyot Formation. These include Kuru, Shri devi, and an undescribed specimen which has been referred to Velociraptor, but may represent a new taxon.

It has been speculated that these animals may have had similar prey preferences, but it is also possible that they each filled a unique ecological niche due to the presumed difference in the skull length of Shri devi and Kuru. However, multiple researchers have noted that the skulls are too incompletely known to make any concrete hypotheses on the matter.

=== Paleoenvironment ===
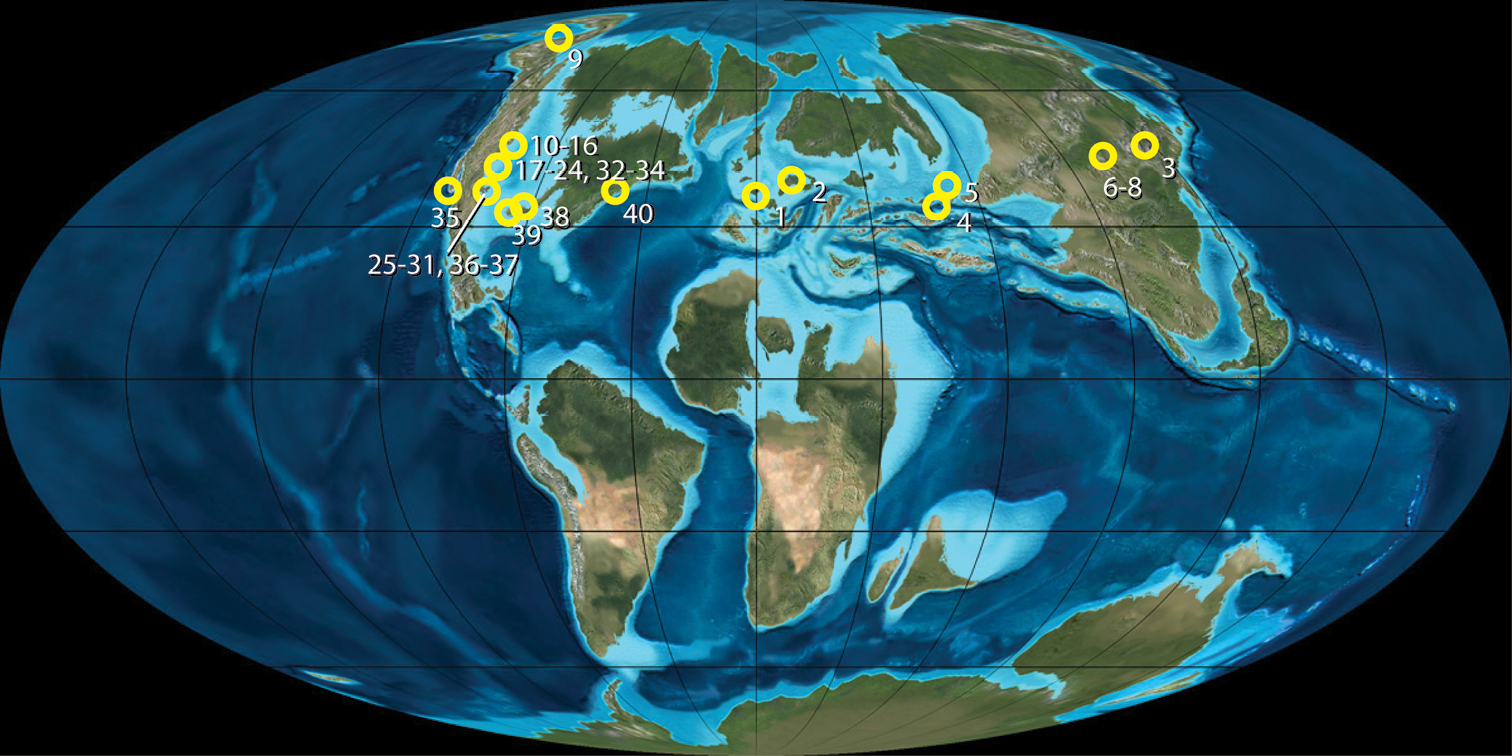
A map of the world in the Campanian, with the Barun Goyot Formation labeled "6-8"

The type and only specimen of Kuru was found at a locality called Khulsan of the Barun Goyot Formation, which is near the Mongolian city of Gurvan Tes in the Ömnögovi Province. This locality is very close to an outcropping of the Nemegt Formation, which is believed to be younger than the Barun Goyot Formation.

The sediments of the formation were deposited in various conditions, with the lower part consisting of alternating dune deposits and lakes that existed in interdune areas, while the upper part consisted of sediments that were deposited over an area similar to takyrs that was flooded at irregular intervals. This formation is mostly characterized by series of red beds, mostly light-coloured sands (yellowish, grey-brown, and rarely reddish) that are locally cemented. Sandy claystones, siltstones, conglomerates, and large-scale trough cross-stratification in sands are also common across the unit. In addition, structureless, medium-grained, fine-grained and very fine-grained sandstones predominate in sediments of the formation.

The overall geology of the formation indicates that sediments were deposited under relatively arid to semiarid climates in alluvial plain, lacustrine, and aeolian paleoenvironments, with addition of other short-lived water bodies.

=== Contemporary fauna ===
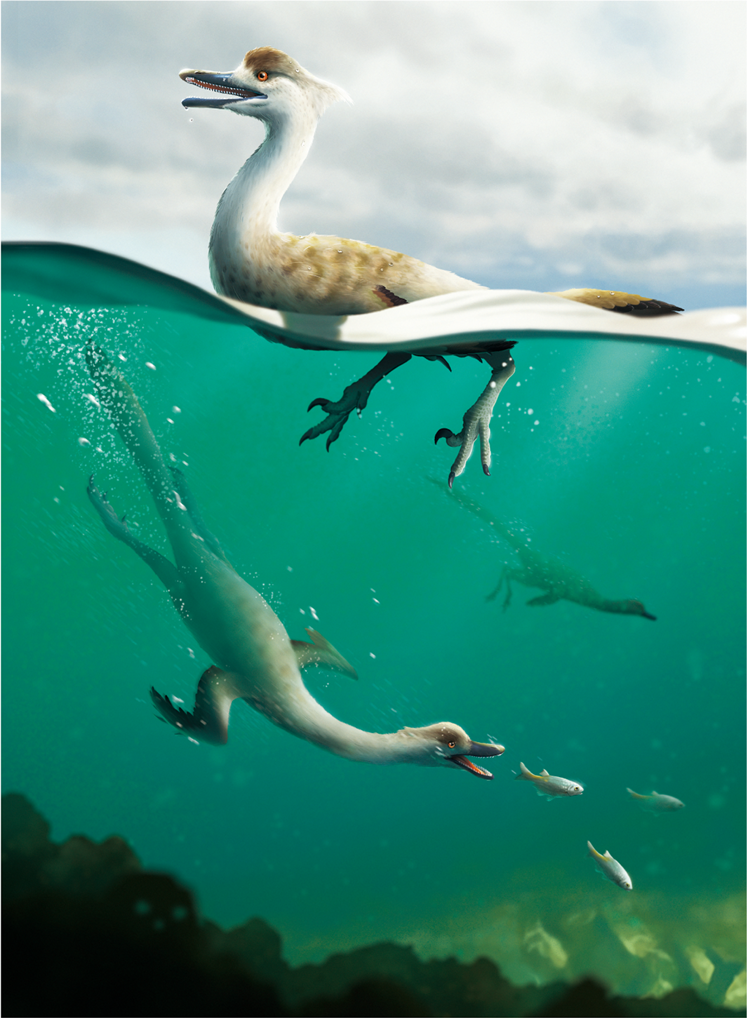
An artistic rendition of the contemporary Natovenator in its environment

The Barun Goyot Formation is similar to the underlying Djadochta Formation in being composed of aeolian dune deposits which primarily preserve small and mid-sized animals. Several named lizard genera are known including Gobiderma and Estesia. Mammals were also abundant in the region during the Cretaceous. They are represented by multituberculates such as Catopsbaatar and Nemegtbaatar, metatherians like Deltatheridium, and eutherians like Asioryctes and Barunlestes.

Dinosaurs are the most well-represented vertebrates from Barun Goyot. There are several ankylosaur fossils including Saichania, Tarchia, Zaraapelta, and an undescribed taxon from the Hermiin Tsav locality. A single sauropod skull is also known from Barun Goyot, and was given the name Quaesitosaurus. Marginocephalians are also present and are represented by the pachycephalosaur Tylocephale and the ceratopsian Bagaceratops, which is the most common animal found in the formation.

The most species-rich dinosaur group represented at Barun Goyot are the maniraptorans. They include at least four alvarezsaurs (Ceratonykus, Khulsanurus, Ondogurvel, and Parvicursor) and several oviraptorosaurs, such as Nemegtomaia, which are also found in the Nemegt Formation. Dromaeosaurs were also common and included Shri devi, the possibly semiaquatic Natovenator, and an unnamed taxon. The smallest maniraptorans present were the birds. These included the enigmatic Hollanda, the more well-understood Gobipteryx, and numerous fossilized eggs which preserve bird embryos.

== See also ==
- 2021 in archosaur paleontology
- Alagteeg Formation, Bayan Mandahu Formation, Bayan Shireh Formation, Djadochta Formation, Nemegt Formation - other well studied fossil-bearing rock formations in Mongolia
- Biogeography of paravian dinosaurs
- List of Asian dinosaurs
- List of vertebrate fauna of the Maastrichtian stage
- Prehistoric Planet
- Timeline of dromaeosaurid research
