= Bayantsagaan =

Bayantsagaan (Mongolian:Баянцагаан, rich white) is the name of several sums (districts) in Mongolia:

- Bayantsagaan, Bayankhongor
- Bayantsagaan, Töv

== See also ==
- Bayan (disambiguation)
- Tsagaan (disambiguation)
