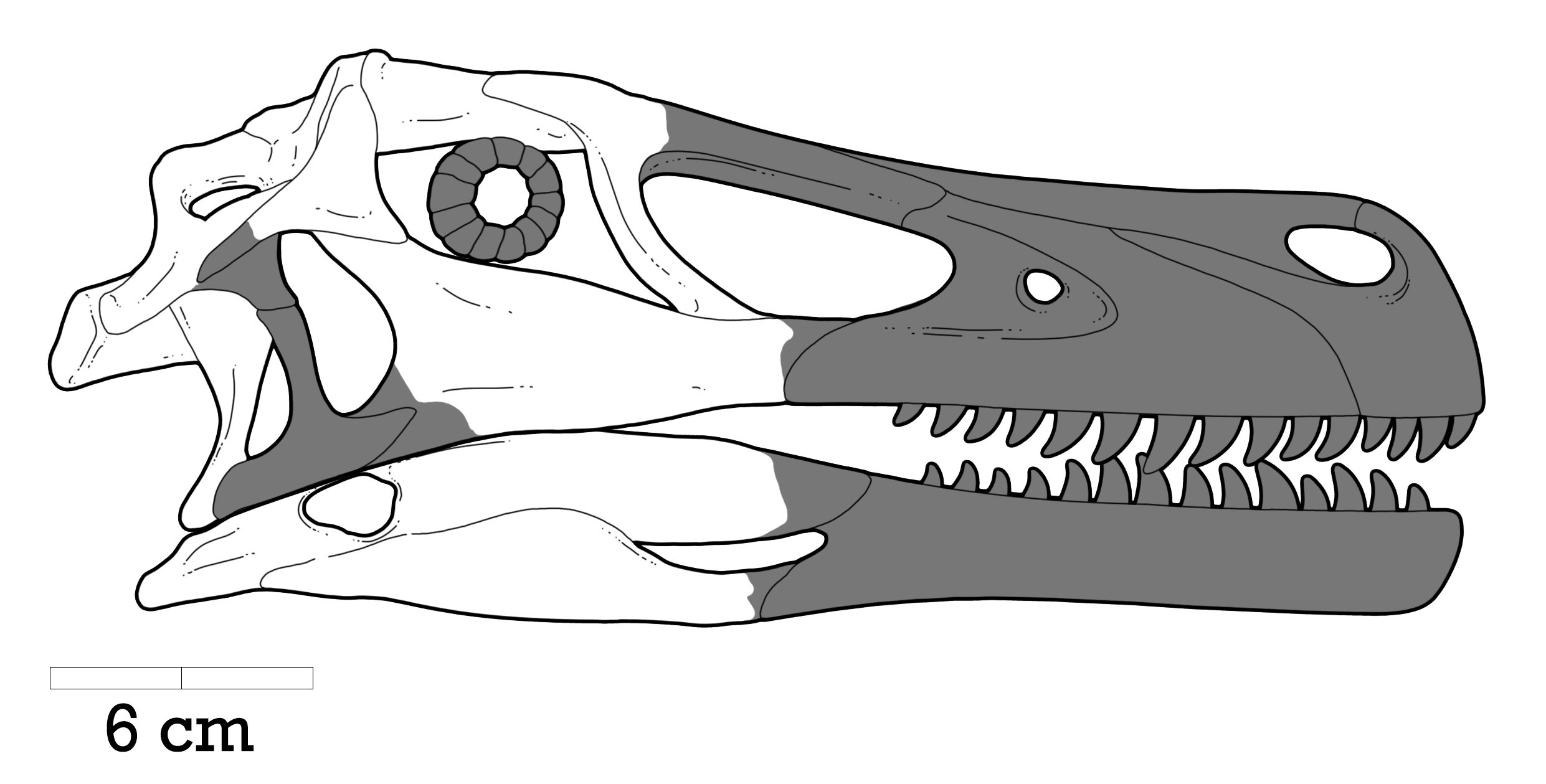
- Reconstructed skull from the holotype

Scientific classification
- Kingdom: Animalia
- Phylum: Chordata
- Class: Reptilia
- Clade: Dinosauria
- Clade: Saurischia
- Clade: Theropoda
- Family: †Dromaeosauridae
- Clade: †Eudromaeosauria
- Subfamily: †Velociraptorinae
- Genus: †Adasaurus; Barsbold, 1983

Type species
- †Adasaurus mongoliensis Barsbold, 1983

= Adasaurus =

Adasaurus Temporal range: Late Cretaceous, Maastrichtian

Extinct genus of dinosaurs

Adasaurus (/ˌɑːdəˈsɔːrəs/ AH-də-SOR-əs; meaning "evil lizard") is a genus of dromaeosaurid dinosaur that lived in Asia during the Late Cretaceous period. The genus is known from two partial specimens found in the Nemegt Formation of Mongolia that were partially described in 1983 by the paleontologist Rinchen Barsbold.

Adasaurus was a large dromaeosaurid that was about 2.39–3.5 m (7.8–11.5 ft) long weighing 36.4–87 kg (80–192 lb). Unlike other dromaeosaurids, Adasaurus developed a rather small and blunt sickle claw that likely had a reduced use, and a recurved lacrimal bone; this latter trait is also shared with Austroraptor. Though reduced, the sickle claw retained the characteristic rounded articulation of most dromaeosaurids.

Adasaurus was originally regarded as a dromaeosaurine by Barsbold, a group that includes robust dromaeosaurs with deep jaws. Revisions made to the specimens have shown that this dromaeosaurid belongs to the Velociraptorinae, composed of more lightly-built animals like Velociraptor.

== History of discovery ==
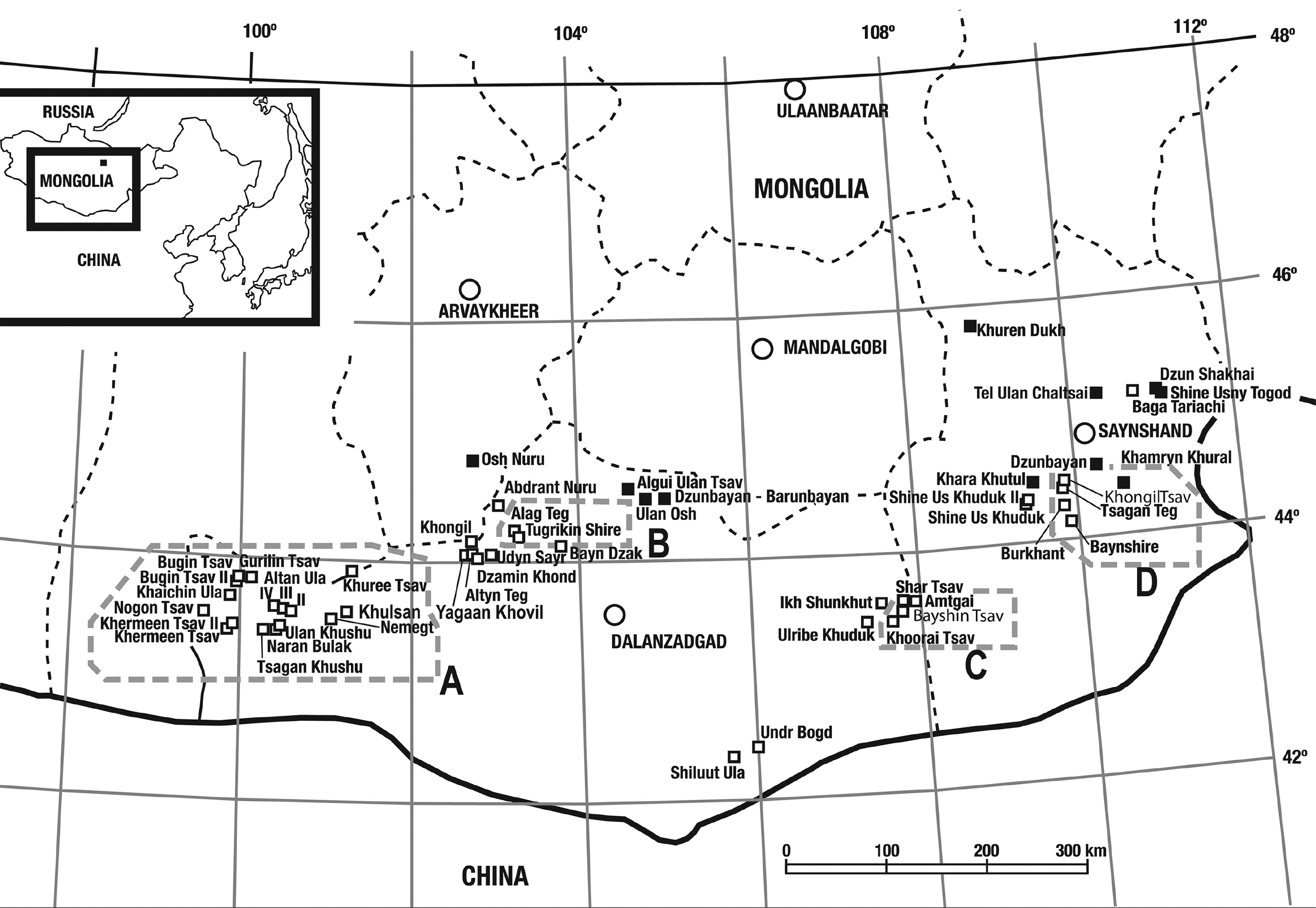
Fossil localities in Mongolia. The fossil remains of Adasaurus have been found in Bügiin Tsav, at Area A

Adasaurus was first figured in 1977 by the Mongolian paleontologist Rinchen Barsbold on a pelvic comparison with other theropods, but it would remain as an informally named taxon until a proper description. In 1983, Barsbold published a large comparative revision of the known Mongolian theropod taxa at the time where he formally named Adasaurus and the type species A. mongoliensis, which was based on two partial specimens. The generic name, Adasaurus, is taken from the Mongolian word ад (ada, meaning evil spirit), and the Greek word σαῦρος (sauros, meaning lizard). The specific name for the single species, mongoliensis, refers to the country of discovery Mongolia. Barsbold briefly described Adasaurus as a dromaeosaurid and noted that this new taxon possessed a notably reduced second pedal ungual. Given that this trait contrasted to the large, sharply-developed ungual of most members, Barsbold listed it as a unique character for Adasaurus. However, the authenticity of this unusual reduction was disputed in 2010 by Phil Senter, who claimed that the supposed ungual did not pertain to the specimen. Nevertheless, in the revised diagnosis conducted by Turner and colleagues in 2012, this character is still considered as authentic, which has been widely followed by other authors.

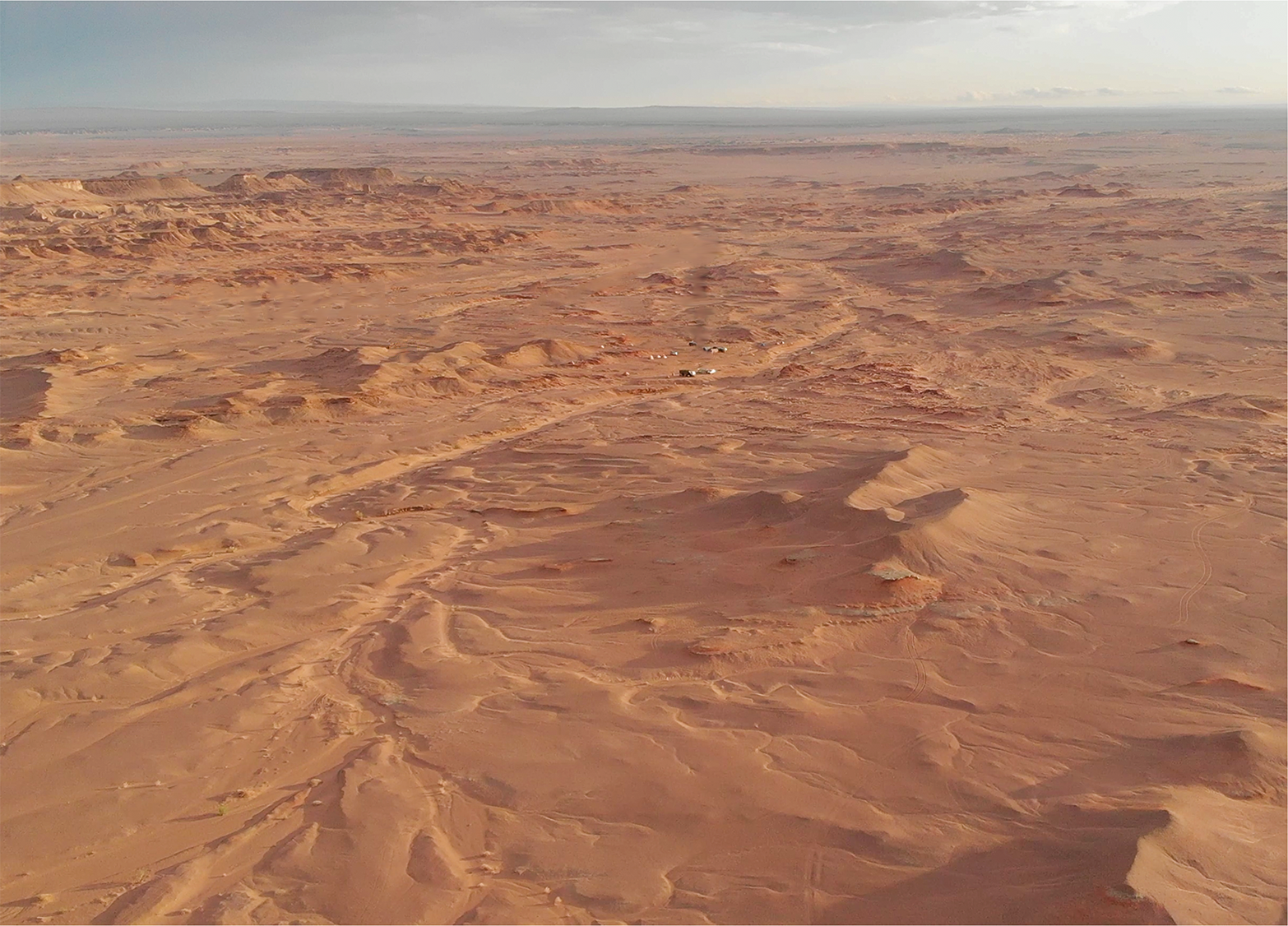
Aerial photograph of the Bügiin Tsav locality, Nemegt Formation

Adasaurus is known from the holotype MPC-D 100/20, which represents an adult individual comprising a partial skull missing its anterior region, the right scapulocoracoid and a sternal plate, 8 cervical vertebrae, 11 partial dorsal vertebrae, the sacrum, 7 caudal vertebrae, partial hindlimbs with the right foot, and a nearly complete right pelvic girdle comprising the ilium, ischium and pubis. A second specimen is represented by the less complete paratype MPC-D 100/21 that includes two caudal vertebrae and a nearly complete right foot. Both specimens were unearthed from the Nemegt Formation at the locality of Bügiin Tsav, in the Gobi Desert of Mongolia. In 2004, Philip J. Currie and David J. Varricchio referred another two specimens to Adasaurus labelled as IGM 100/22 and IGM 100/23. Supposedly, the specimens were recovered from the same locality of the holotype. However, these specimens are actually known from the Shine Us Khuduk and Tel Ulan Chaltsai localities (respectively) of the Bayan Shireh Formation and thus, they are older than the remains of Adasaurus from the younger Nemegt Formation. They represent a different and new taxon that differs from Adasaurus.

== Description ==
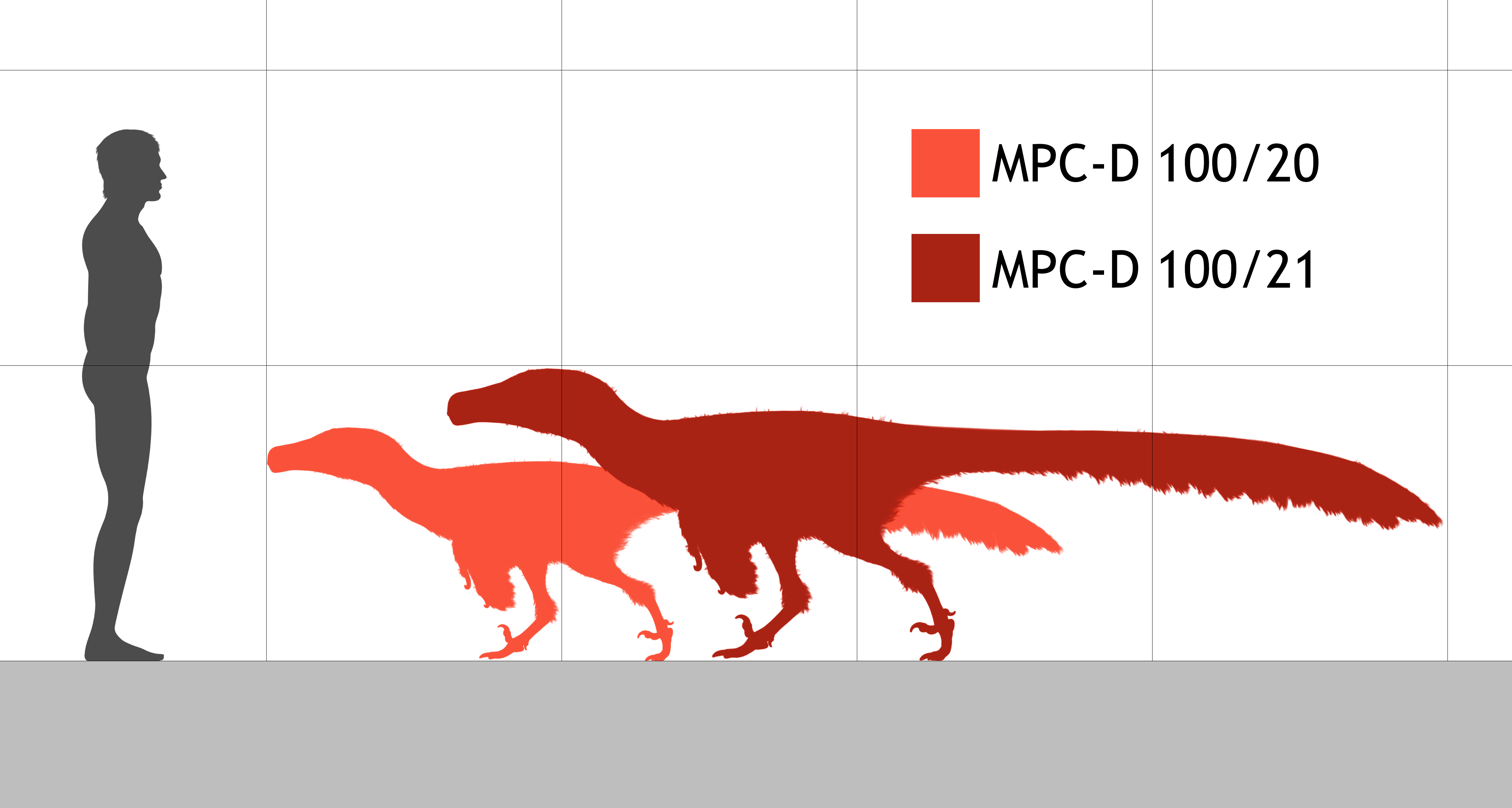
Size comparison of the holotype and paratype to an 1.8 m tall human

Adasaurus was a rather large-sized dromaeosaurid. The holotype has an estimated length of 2.39 m (7.8 ft) with a weight of 36.5 kg (80 lb). The comparatively larger pedal elements of the paratype indicate a gently bigger size in this latter specimen which is estimated around 3.5 m (11 ft) long and 87 kg (192 lb) in body mass. Aside from the reduced pedal ungual II, Adasaurus can be recognised by the following additional traits: expanded projection of the maxillary; recurved lacrimal; lower jaw with a prominent surangular foramen; irregular triangular projection on the quadrate shaft; pleurocoels are present on the anterior sacral vertebrae; and the anterior border of the anterior blade in the ilium is relatively shortened.

=== Skull ===
On the right side of the skull, the lower portion of the jugal is expanded from the top to the bottom. The quadrate is a large and vertical bone with a large triangular projection on its lateral border. This triangular projection is located on the quadrate shaft and bent to the top. The top surface of the right ectopterygoid—a smaller bone of the palate—is flattened to the palate. As in other dromaeosaurids, the lacrimal has an inverted L-shape, but the thin body of this bone is curved, which is also seen in Austroraptor.

=== Skeleton ===
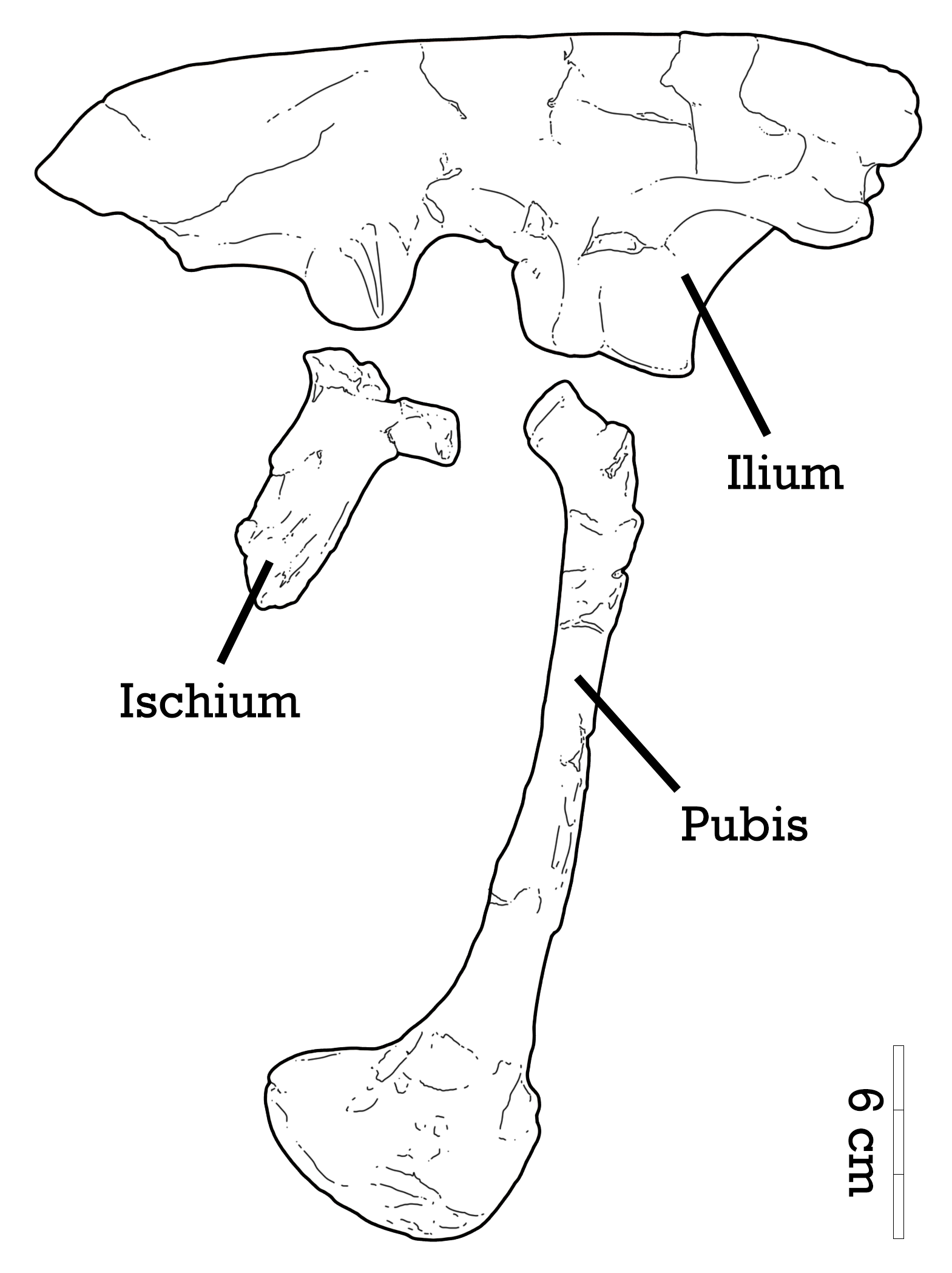
Labelled diagram of the holotype right pelvis

The scapula and coracoid of the holotype are completely fused giving form to the scapulocoracoid, and the suture between them is not present. Pneumatic foramina are present in the holotypic anterior sacral vertebrae. The femur and tibia of the holotype measure 27.3 cm (10.7 in) and 30.3 cm (11.9 in) long, respectively, and the fourth trochanter is a prominent and rugose ridge that is located on the posterior inner surface of the upper region of the femoral shaft. The femur itself is very similar to that of the indeterminate dromaeosaur DGBU-78 from the Gugyedong Formation of South Korea. The anterior surface of the lower end of the femoral shaft is convex in shape, and the lateral tubercle of the upper end of the tibia-fibula articulation is a compact structure. The presence of a rounded pit on the inner surface of the lower tibiotarsus is often documented in dromaeosaurids, however, this feature is not verifiable in Adasaurus since the astragalus region is covered with sediments.

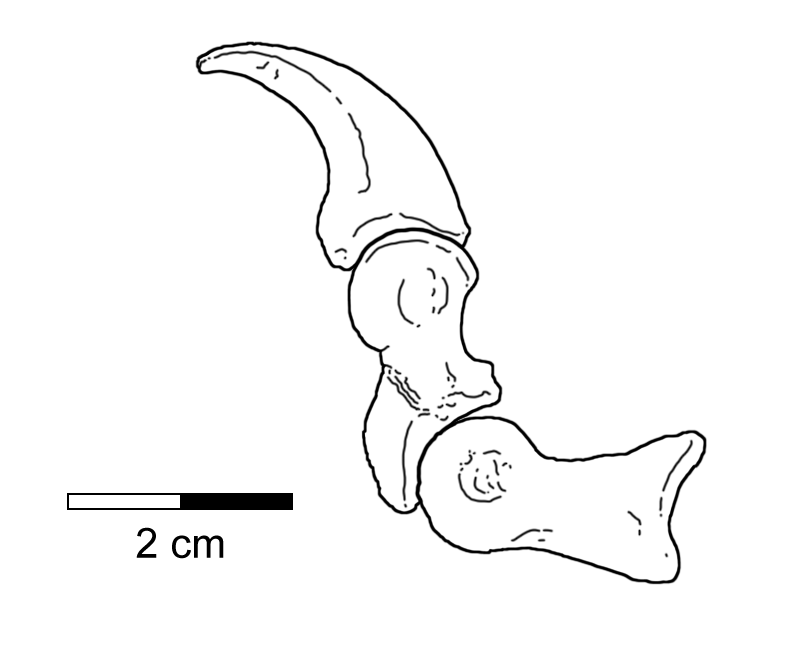
Line diagram showing the reduced sickle claw from the holotype

The posterior top border of the ilium is proportionally more thickened than that of Achillobator, and the anterior border of the anterior blade of the ilium has a similar shape to that of Saurornitholestes. This anterior border has a notched appearance that is characteristic to Adasaurus. As a whole, the top border is straightened in shape. The pubic peduncle—a robust anterior extension that articulates with the pubis—is wide and developed to the bottom. A large supratrochanteric (above the trochanter of the femur) extension is absent on the ilium. Like other dromaeosaurids, the pubis is elongated with an expanded pubic boot (lower end) and features an opisthopubic (backwards directed) condition. The digit II ungual is not hypertrophied (elongated) as in most dromaeosaurids, and though Adasaurus features a similar metatarsal II-III ratio to that of Balaur, this is due to the reduced sickle claw of digit II instead of an elongated ungual of digit I. Metatarsal III of the paratype shows that a tubercle is present on the extensor surface and this tuberosity likely originates the insertion of the muscle tibialis cranialis. The lower tarsals and upper ends of the metatarsals are somewhat fused.

== Classification ==
Adasaurus is a member of Dromaeosauridae, a group that is closely related to living birds. When erected by Barsbold in 1983, Velociraptorinae was conceived as a group containing Velociraptor and closely related species that were characterized by their smaller size and long-narrow snouts. However, Barsbold did not include Adasaurus in the group; instead, he placed it within the Dromaeosaurinae. It was not until 1998 that this group was defined as a clade by Paul Sereno. Sereno defined the group as all dromaeosaurids more closely related to Velociraptor than to Dromaeosaurus. Kubota and Barsbold in 2006 during their reexamination of Adasaurus found this taxon to be more closely related to Velociraptor than other dromaeosaurids. The traditional view of the Velociraptorinae commonly included Velociraptor, Tsaagan and Linheraptor, which are known from complete skulls, however, most analyses vary widely regarding which species are actually velociraptorines and which are dromaeosaurines. Turner and colleagues in 2012 supported a traditional, monophyletic composition of Velociraptorinae. However, some studies found a very different group of dromaeosaurids in Velociraptorinae, such as Longrich and Currie in 2009, which recovered Deinonychus outside of the Velociraptorine and Dromaeosaurinae. Traditionally, Adasaurus was assigned to the Dromaeosaurinae, which includes giant, heavily built animals such as Achillobator and Utahraptor but several analyses have suggested that it belongs to the Velociraptorinae instead.

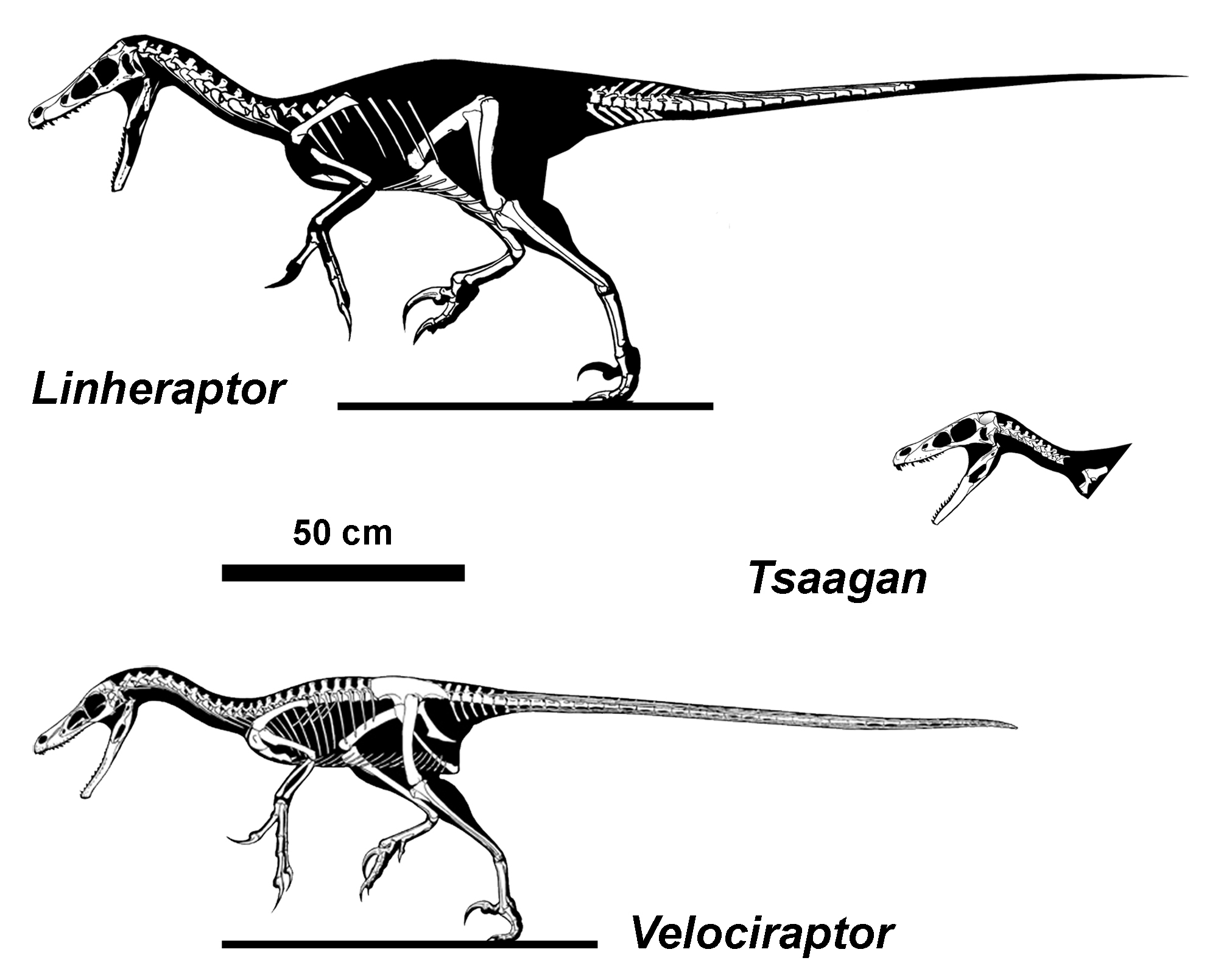
Comparison between some members of Velociraptorinae, featuring Linheraptor, Tsaagan and Velociraptor

Below is a cladogram based on the phylogenetic analysis conducted by James G. Napoli and colleagues in 2021:

- Velociraptorinae
  - unnamed
    - Linheraptor
    - Tsaagan
  - unnamed
    - Deinonychus
    - unnamed
      - unnamed
        - Adasaurus
        - Kuru
      - - Balaur
        - unnamed
          - Shri
          - Velociraptor

== Paleobiology ==
=== Paleopathology ===
In 1997, Norell and Makovicky stated that the holotype specimen of Adasaurus represents a largely pathologic (due to injury or disease) individual. They reaffirmed this observation in 2004 by claiming the pelvis as pathological. However, during the large revision of the Dromaeosauridae by Turner and colleagues in 2012, the holotype was re-examined and found to be non-pathological. Instead of reflect injured elements, several surfaces may represent the advanced age of the individual, such as the fused upper ends of the metatarsus.

=== Sickle claw function ===
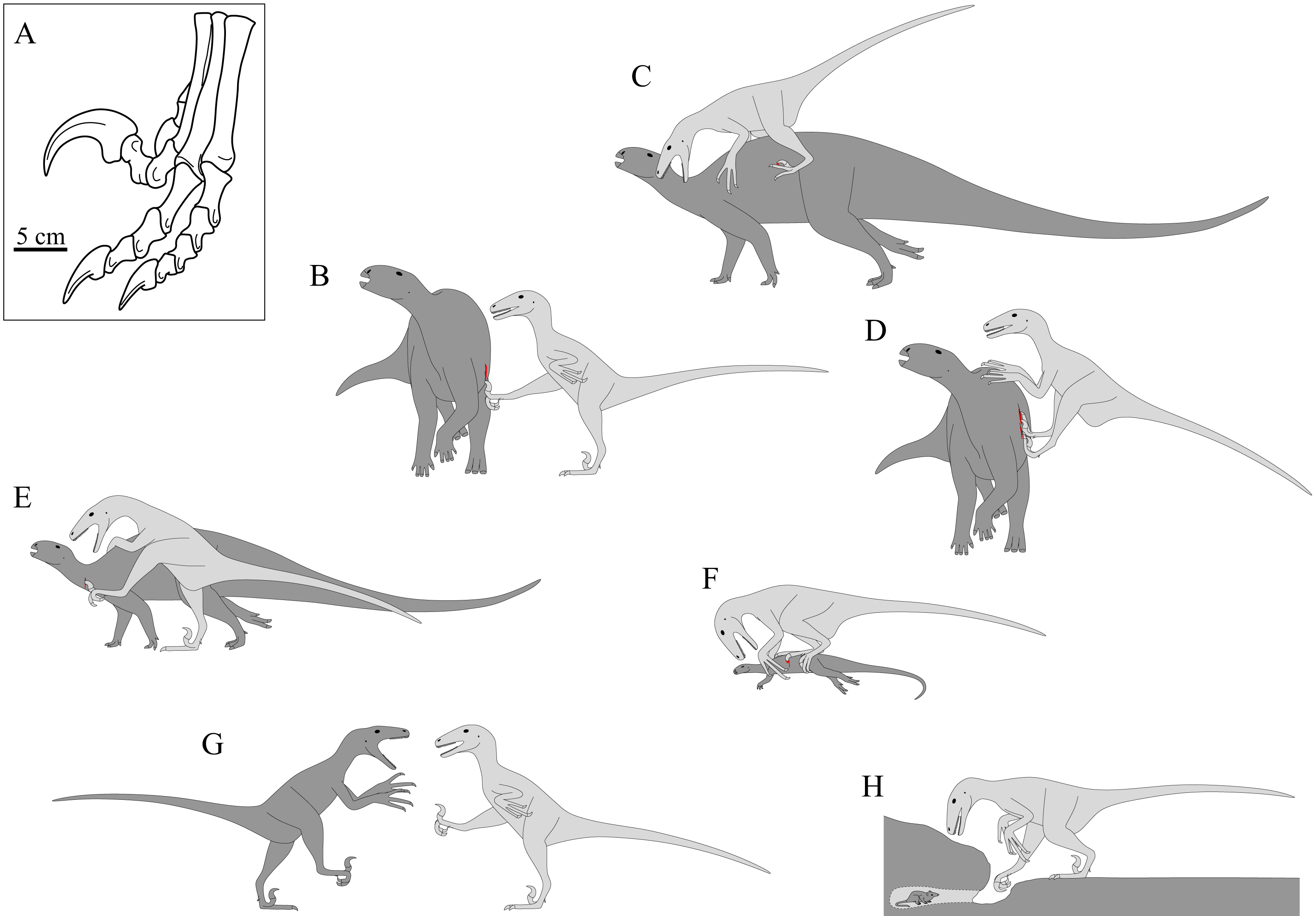
Proposed scenarios for the sickle claw function, with C, D and F as the more supported behaviors

Kubota and Barsbold in 2006 stated that the highly reduced sickle claw of Adasaurus may have been used with less frequency than other deinonychosaurs as the bottom surface of lower heel on the penultimate phalanx has no apparent asymmetrical ridges like other dromaeosaurids and troodontids.

In 2011, Denver Fowler and colleagues suggested a new method by which dromaeosaurids may have taken smaller prey. This predation model, "Raptor Prey Restraint" (RPR), proposes that dromaeosaurids killed their prey by leaping onto their quarry, pinning it under their body weight, and gripping it tightly with the large, sickle claws of the pedal digit II—in a manner very similar to extant accipitrid birds of prey. Like accipitrids, the dromaeosaurid would then begin to feed on the animal while still alive, until it eventually died from blood loss and organ failure. This proposal is based primarily on comparisons between the morphology and proportions of the feet and legs of dromaeosaurids to several groups of extant birds of prey with fairly known predatory behaviors. Fowler and colleagues found that the feet and legs of dromaeosaurids most closely resemble those of eagles and hawks, especially in terms of having an enlarged second claw and a similar range of grasping motion, but the short metatarsus and foot strength would have been more similar to that of owls. The RPR model would be consistent with other aspects of dromaeosaurid anatomy, such as their unusual dentition and arm morphology. The arms were covered in long feathers and may have been used as flapping stabilizers for balance while atop a struggling prey, along with the stiff counter-balancing tail. Lastly, the comparatively weak jaws would have been useful for eating prey alive but not as useful for forceful dispatch of the prey.

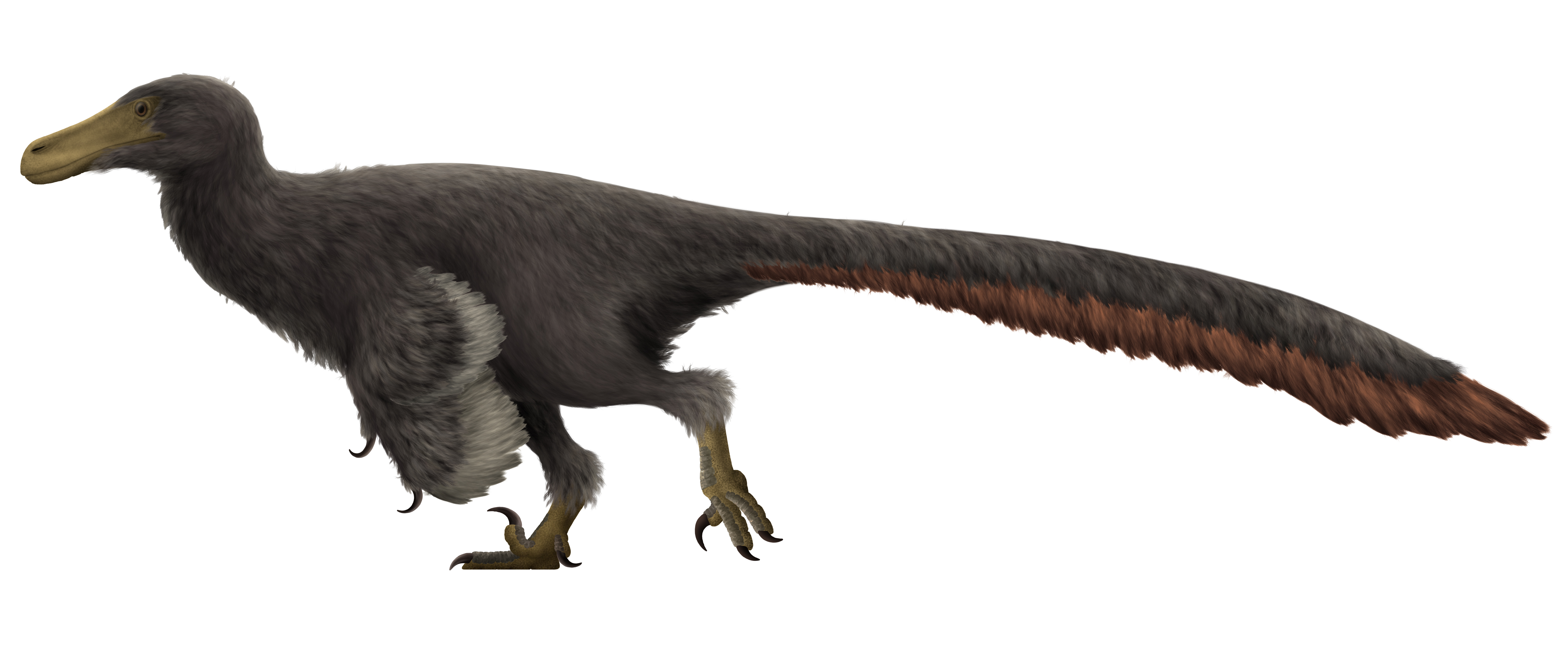
Life restoration showing the reduced sickle claw; Adasaurus may have used this appendage with less frequency than other dromaeosaurids

In 2019, Peter Bishop reconstructed the leg skeleton and musculature of Deinonychus by using three-dimensional models of muscles, tendons, and bones. With the addition of mathematical models and equations, Bishop simulated the conditions that would provide maximum force at the tip of the sickle claw and therefore the most likely function. Among the proposed modes of the sickle claw use are: kicking to cut, slash or disembowel prey; for gripping onto the flanks of prey; piercing aided by body weight; to attack vital areas of the prey; to restrain prey; intra- or interspecific competition; and digging out prey from hideouts. The results obtained by Bishop showed that a crouching posture increased the claw forces; however, these forces remained relatively weak, indicating that the claws were not strong enough to be used in slashing strikes. Rather than being used for slashing, the sickle claws were more likely to be useful in flexed leg angles such as restraining prey and stabbing prey at close quarters. These results are consistent with the Fighting Dinosaurs specimen, which preserves a Velociraptor and Protoceratops locked in combat, with the former gripping onto the other with its claws in a non-extended leg posture. Despite the obtained results, Bishop considered that the capabilities of the sickle claw could have varied within taxa given that among dromaeosaurids, Adasaurus had an unusually smaller sickle claw that retained the characteristic ginglymoid—a structure divided in two parts—and hyperextensible articular surface of the penultimate phalange. He could neither confirm nor disregard that the pedal digit II could have loss or retain its functionally.

== Paleoenvironment ==
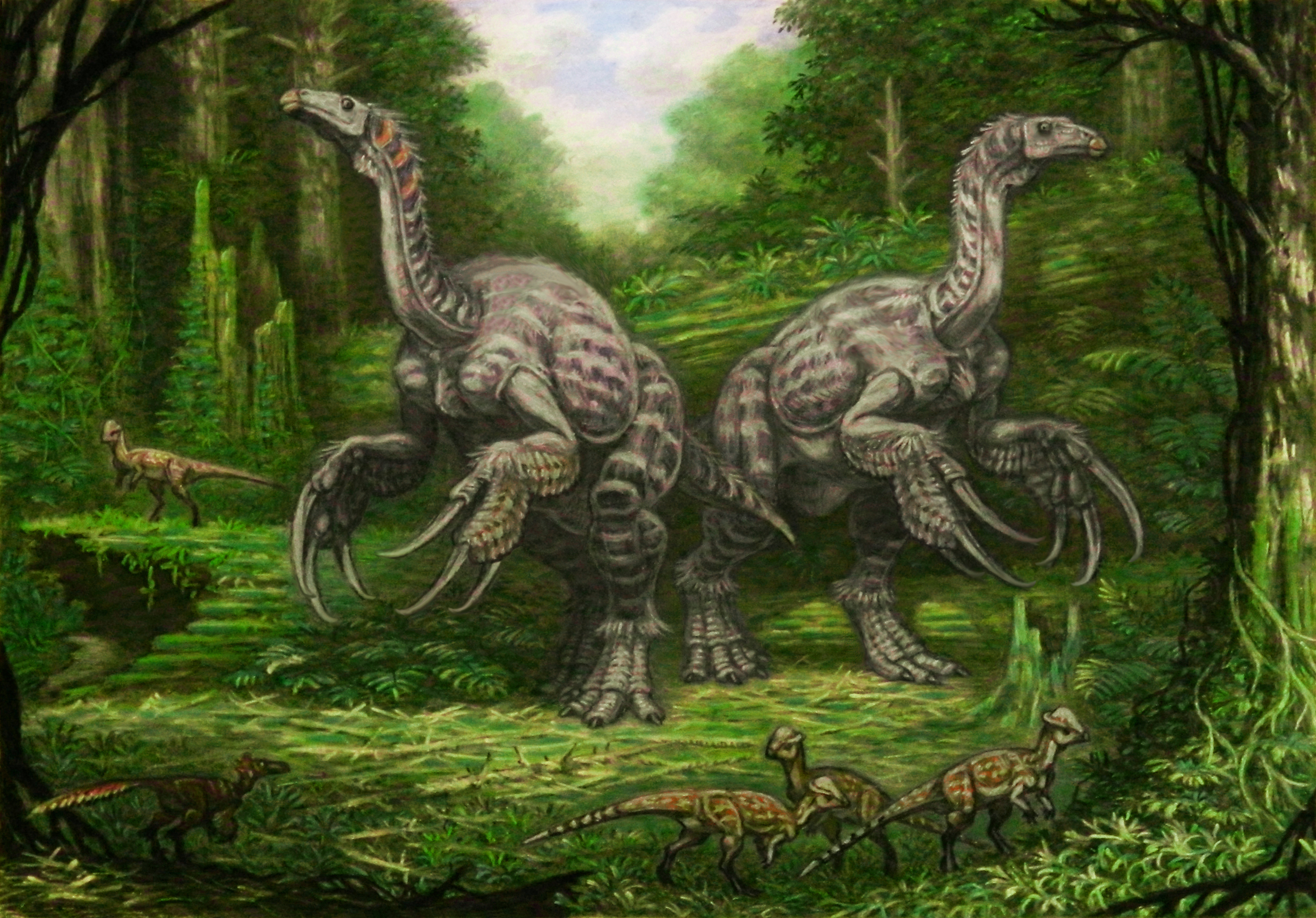
Restoration of Adasaurus (bottom left) alongside a small group of Prenocephale and Therizinosaurus

Adasaurus is known from the Late Cretaceous Nemegt Formation, the age of which has been considered from the Late Campanian to Early-Middle Maastrichtian stages, about 70 million and 68 million years ago. The environments that were present on the formation included stream and river channels, mudflats, and shallow lakes. Much of the sedimentation also indicates that a rich habitat existed, offering extensive vegetation in abundant amounts that could sustain most herbivorous dinosaurs. Most fluvial systems functioned as oases for oviraptorosaurs. Other dinosaurs found in this formation include the ornithomimosaurs Anserimimus, Gallimimus, and a taxon that remains unnamed; diverse oviraptorosaurs such as Nemegtomaia, Elmisaurus and Gobiraptor; and the troodontid Zanabazar. Large dinosaurs in this formation are represented by Deinocheirus, Saurolophus, Tarbosaurus and Therizinosaurus.

== See also ==
- Timeline of dromaeosaurid research
