= Tsagaan =

Tsagaan (Mongolian: цагаан, white, Chinese: 查干) may refer to:

== People ==
- Monguor people or Tsagaan mongghol, a Mongol ethnic group in China
- Tsagaan Puntsag a Mongolian entrepreneur
- Okna Tsahan Zam (born 1957), a Kalmyk throat singer
- Chagaan, 13th-century commander of the Mongol Empire

== Places in Mongolia ==
- Baatsagaan, Bayankhongor
- Bayantsagaan, Bayankhongor
- Bayantsagaan, Töv
- Buutsagaan, Bayankhongor
- Erdenetsagaan, Sükhbaatar
- Saintsagaan, Dundgovi
- Tsagaanchuluut, Zavkhan
- Tsagaandelger, Dundgovi
- Tsagaankhairkhan, Uvs
- Tsagaankhairkhan, Zavkhan
- Tsagaan-Ovoo, Dornod
- Tsagaan-Uul, Khövsgöl
- Tsagaan-Üür, Khövsgöl

== Others ==
- Tsagaan Sar, the Mongolian New Year festival
- Tsaagan, the dinosaur Tsaagan mangas (technically a misspelling)
- Tsagaan Khas, a Mongolian far-right organisation
- Tsagaannuur (disambiguation)
