= Tsagaannuur =

Tsagaannuur (Mongolian: цагааннуур, white lake) is a common place name in Mongolia:

- Terkhiin Tsagaan Nuur, a lake in the Arkhangai Aimag (province)
- Dood Tsagaan nuur, a lake in the Khövsgöl Aimag
  - Tsagaannuur, Khövsgöl, the sum (district) west of the lake
- two other sums in different aimags of Mongolia:
  - Tsagaannuur, Bayan-Ölgii
  - Tsagaannuur, Selenge

== See also ==
- Tsagaan (disambiguation)
