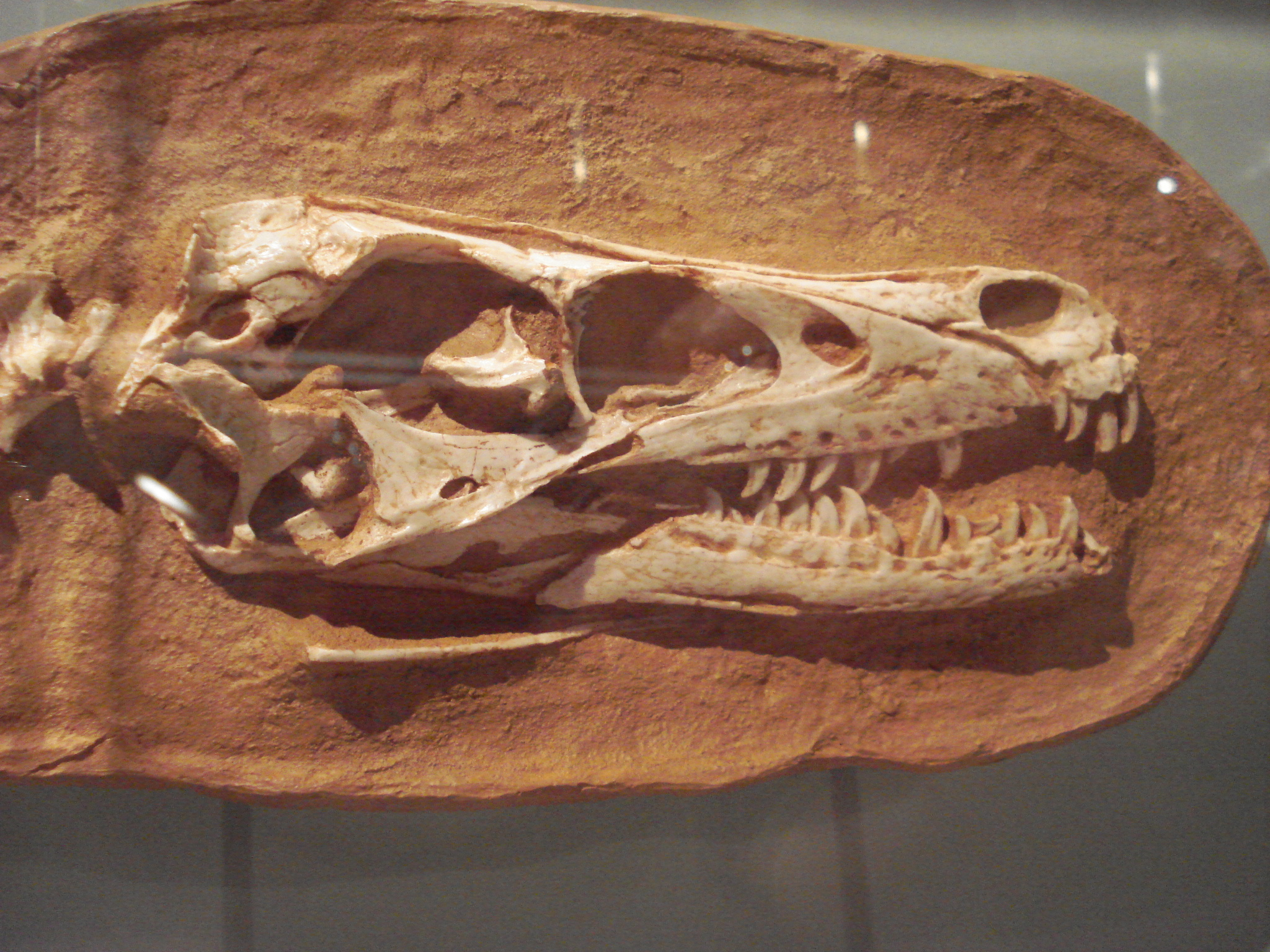
- Holotype skull

Scientific classification
- Kingdom: Animalia
- Phylum: Chordata
- Class: Reptilia
- Clade: Dinosauria
- Clade: Saurischia
- Clade: Theropoda
- Family: †Dromaeosauridae
- Clade: †Eudromaeosauria
- Subfamily: †Velociraptorinae
- Genus: †Tsaagan; Norell et al., 2006
- Species: †T. mangas

Binomial name
- †Tsaagan mangas Norell et al., 2006

= Tsaagan =

Tsaagan Temporal range: Late Cretaceous, 75 Ma

Extinct genus of dinosaurs

Tsaagan (meaning "white") is a genus of dromaeosaurid dinosaur from the Djadokhta Formation of the Late Cretaceous of Mongolia.

== Discovery and naming ==
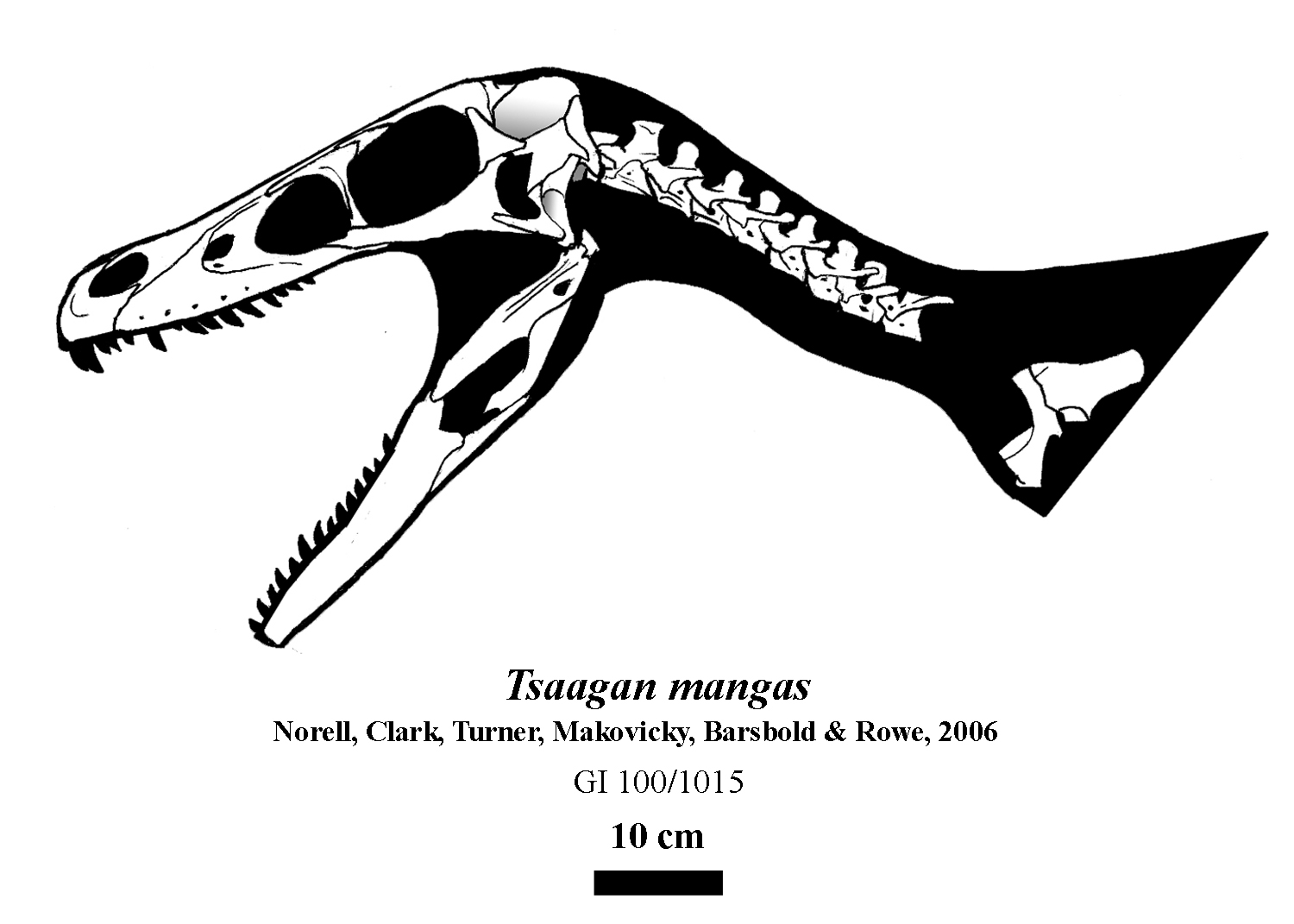
Skeletal showing the known remains from the holotype

The holotype of Tsaagan was discovered in 1996 and first identified as a specimen of Velociraptor. After a CAT-scan in May 1998 it was concluded that it represented a new genus. In December 2006 its type species was named and described by Mark Norell, James Clark, Alan Turner, Peter Makovicky, Rinchen Barsbold and Timothy Rowe. The species name, Tsaagan mangas, should be read as a whole with the generic name qualifying the specific epithet, and is derived from the Mongolian words for "white monster" (цагаан мангас), although with an accidental misspelling of the word Tsagaan.

The holotype specimen, IGM 100/1015, was found near Xanadu in Ömnögovi Province in layers of the Djadokhta Formation dating to the Campanian, about 75 million years ago. It consists of a well-preserved skull and series of ten neck vertebrae as well as a damaged left shoulder girdle. It is the only specimen found of Tsaagan and belonged to an adult individual.

== Description ==
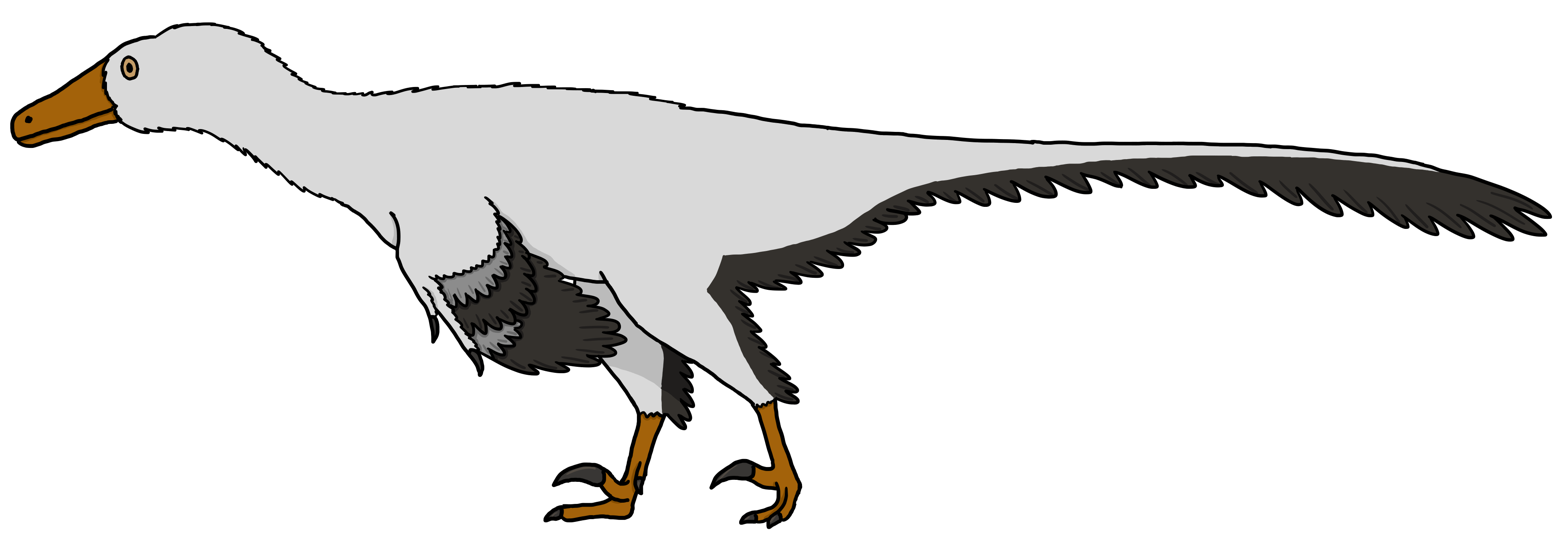
Life restoration

Tsaagan was a medium-sized dromaeosaurid. In 2010 Gregory S. Paul estimated its length at 2 metres (6.6 ft), its weight at 15 kilograms (33 lb). The skull in general appearance resembles that of Velociraptor but differs from it in many details. It is more robust and smooth on top; unique derived traits, autapomorphies, include long paroccipital processes and basipterygoids at the back of the skull and a jugal touching the squamosal.

== Classification ==
Tsaagan is a member of the group Dromaeosauridae. A cladistic analysis by Norell et al. originally indicated it was more precisely a member of the Velociraptorinae. In 2010 an analysis showed it was closely related to Linheraptor; subsequently Senter (2011) and Turner, Makovicky and Norell (2012) argued that Linheraptor exquisitus is in fact a junior synonym of Tsaagan mangas. Xu, Pittman et al. (2015) reject this synonymy by responding to the counterarguments proposed using new and existing details of Linheraptor's anatomy.

Below are the results for the Eudromaeosauria phylogeny based on the phylogenetic analysis performed by Currie and Evans in 2019:

- Eudromaeosauria
  - - Atrociraptor
    - Saurornitholestes
  - - - Dakotaraptor
      - - IGM 100/22 and IGM 100/23
        - Boreonykus
        - Dromaeosaurus
    - - Deinonychus
      - - - Adasaurus
          - - Achillobator
            - Utahraptor
        - - Acheroraptor
          - - Velociraptor mongoliensis
            - - Velociraptor osmolskae
              - - Linheraptor
                - Tsaagan

== Paleoenvironment ==
Tsaagan represents the only dromaeosaurid remains (other than isolated teeth) known from the Ukhaa Tolgod region, though another dromaeosaurid, Velociraptor, is known from the same Djadokhta Formation. Animals that may have shared the same habitat with Tsaagan include Protoceratops, Shuvuuia, the small mammal Zalambdalestes, the multituberculate mammal Kryptobaatar, as well as several lizards and two yet-undescribed species of troodontid and dromaeosaurid.

== See also ==
- Timeline of dromaeosaurid research
