= Mark Norell =

American paleontogist (1957–2025)

- Born: July 26, 1957; Saint Paul, Minnesota, U.S.
- Died: September 9, 2025 (aged 68); New York City, U.S.
- Education: Long Beach State University (AB); San Diego State University (MS); Yale University (PhD)
- Awards: Orbis Pictus Award; Scientific American's Young Readers Book of the Year Award; New York City Leader of the Year
- Scientific career
- Fields: Paleontology; cladistics; molecular genetics
- Workplaces: American Museum of Natural History

Mark Allen Norell (July 26, 1957 – September 9, 2025) was an American vertebrate paleontologist. He was the chairman of paleontology and a research associate at the American Museum of Natural History up until his death in 2025. He is best known as the discoverer of the first theropod embryo and for the description of feathered dinosaurs. Norell is credited with the naming of the genera Apsaravis, Byronosaurus, Citipati, Tsaagan, and Achillobator. His work regularly appeared in major scientific journals (including cover stories in Science and Nature) and was listed by Time magazine as one of the ten most significant science stories of 1993, 1994 and 1996. Norell was both a fellow of the Explorer's Club and the Willi Hennig Society. He has appeared in several science documentaries, including The Dinosaurs (PBS, 1992), "Dinosaurs of the Gobi" on the PBS series Nova (PBS, 1994), and Miracle Planet (NHK / NFB Canada, 2005).

== Career ==
Born in Saint Paul, Minnesota, in 1957, Norell's research has encompassed a number of different areas, from the theoretical study of diversity through time, his doctoral dissertation on alligator phylogeny, and his postdoctoral work on evolutionary variations in maize. Following his M.S. at San Diego, Norell published papers on the efficacy of the fossil record in capturing phylogenetic history, and how missing data can influence the estimation of phylogeny.

Norell became a curator at the American Museum of Natural History in 1990 and helped oversee the renovation of the Halls of Vertebrate Evolution. The organization, where visitors progress in a circular motion around the floor, mirrors the evolutionary patterns of a phylogenetic tree. Thus, guests begin their exploration with the simplest vertebrates, placoderms and bony fishes, and conclude their visit with advanced mammals, such as mammoths and artiodactyls.

Norell's studies largely centered on the evolution of birds and developing new ways of observing fossils through CT scans and imaging computers. He led over twenty international paleontological expeditions, in locales such as Patagonia, Cuba, the Chilean Andes, the Sahara and West Africa. The famous Mongolia project, which has delivered numerous discoveries in vertebrate evolution, has received world-wide attention.

Norell died on September 8, 2025, at a hospital in Manhattan, New York City, from heart failure, at the age of 68.

== Mentorship ==
Norell mentored many students and postdocs. Among the latter were Luis Chiappe, Gao Keqin, Xu Xing, Julia Clarke, Gabe Bever, Albert Prieto-Marquez, Jonah Choiniere, Emanuel Tschopp, Jack Conrad, Ashley Heers and Kimi Chapelle.

== Notable discoveries ==
Mark Norell was the direct discoverer of the enigmatic theropod Shuvuuia, co-led the group that discovered Ukhaa Tolgod, the richest Cretaceous terrestrial vertebrate fossil locality in the world, discovered the first embryo of a theropod dinosaur, described a series of dinosaurs with feathers, and discovered the first direct evidence of dinosaur brooding. Norell's theoretical work has a focus of data evaluation in large cladistic sets, as well as fossil pattern estimation through phylogeny, in order to see trends in diversity and extinction. He has authored several papers that discuss the relationship between stratigraphic position and phylogenetic topology.

== Honors and distinctions ==
In 1998, Norell was named a New York City Leader of the Year by The New York Times. In 2000, he was honored as a distinguished Alumnus of California State University Long Beach. His popular science book, Discovering Dinosaurs, won Scientific American's Young Readers Book of the Year Award. Another of his books for the general public, entitled A Nest of Dinosaurs, was given an Orbis Pictus Award by the National Council of Teachers.

== Dinosaur Hunters ==
Dinosaur Hunters (1996, written and directed by Kage Glantz credited as Kage Kleiner, narrated by Michael Carroll) is a National Geographic documentary about the 1990s AMNH expeditions led in Mongolia, in the Gobi Desert, by paleontologists Mike Novacek and Mark Norell.

== Publications ==
- Norell, M. A., J. M. Clark, and P. J. Makovicky, 2001. "Relationships Among Maniraptora: Problems and Prospects." pp. 49–67. In: New Perspectives on the Origin and Evolution of Birds: Proceedings of the International Symposium in Honor of John H. Ostrom, Gauthier JA, Gall LF (eds). New Haven: Yale University Press.
- Norell, M. A., P. J. Makovicky, and P. J. Currie, 2001. "The Beaks of Ostrich Dinosaurs." Nature 412: 873–874.
- Ji, Q., M. A. Norell, K.-Q. Gao, S.-A. Ji, and D. Ren. "The Distribution of Integumentary Structures in a Feathered Dinosaur." Nature 410 (2001): 1084–1088.
- Norell, M. A., and J. Clarke. "A New Fossil Near the Base of Aves." Nature 409 (2001): 181–184.
- Norell, M. A., J. M. Clark, and L. M. Chiappe. "An Embryo of an Oviraptorid (Dinosauria: Theropoda) from the Late Cretaceous of Ukhaa Tolgod, Mongolia." American Museum Novitates 3315 (2001): pp. 17
- Norell, M. A., P. Makovicky, and J. M. Clark. "A New Troodontid from Ukhaa Tolgod, Late Cretaceous, Mongolia." Journal of Vertebrate Paleontology Rapid Communication 20, no. 1 (2000): 7–11.
- Norell, M. A., L. Dingus, and E. S. Gaffney. Discovering Dinosaurs (2nd edition with 9 new sections). Berkeley: University of California Press, 2000.
- Norell, M. A., and P. Makovicky. "Important Features of the Dromaeosaur Skeleton II: Information From Newly Collected Specimens of Velociraptor mongoliensis." American Museum Novitates 3282 (1999): pp. 45
