= Bayantsagaan, Bayankhongor =

District in Bayankhongor Province, Mongolia

Coordinates: 45°00′51″N 98°55′46″E

Bayantsagaan District Баянцагаан сум ᠪᠠᠶ᠋ᠠᠨᠴᠠᠭᠠᠨᠰᠤᠮᠤ
- District
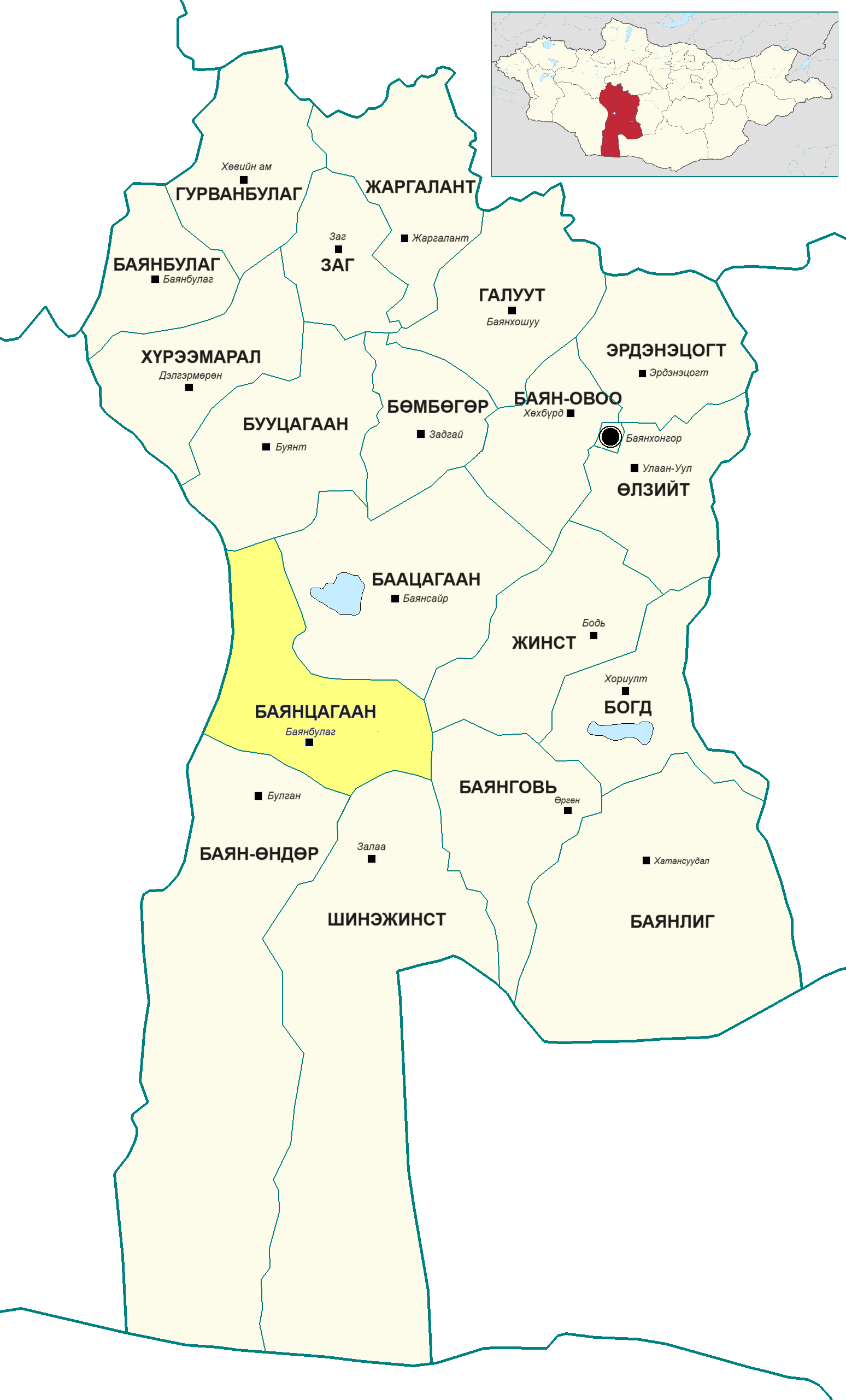
- Country: Mongolia
- Province: Bayankhongor Province

Area
  - Total: 5,395 km^{2} (2,083 sq mi)
- Time zone: UTC+8 (UTC + 8)

Bayantsagaan (Mongolian: Баянцагаан, rich white) is a sum (district) of Bayankhongor Province in southern Mongolia. In 2006, its population was 3,599.

== Administrative divisions ==
The district is divided into five bags, which are:

- Bayanbulag
- Delgerekh
- Gichgene
- Jargalant
- Tsetsen
