= Bayantsagaan, Töv =

District in Töv, Mongolia

Coordinates: 46°46′14″N 107°08′31″E

Bayantsagaan District Баянцагаан сум ᠪᠠᠶ᠋ᠠᠨᠴᠠᠭᠠᠨᠰᠤᠮᠤ
- District
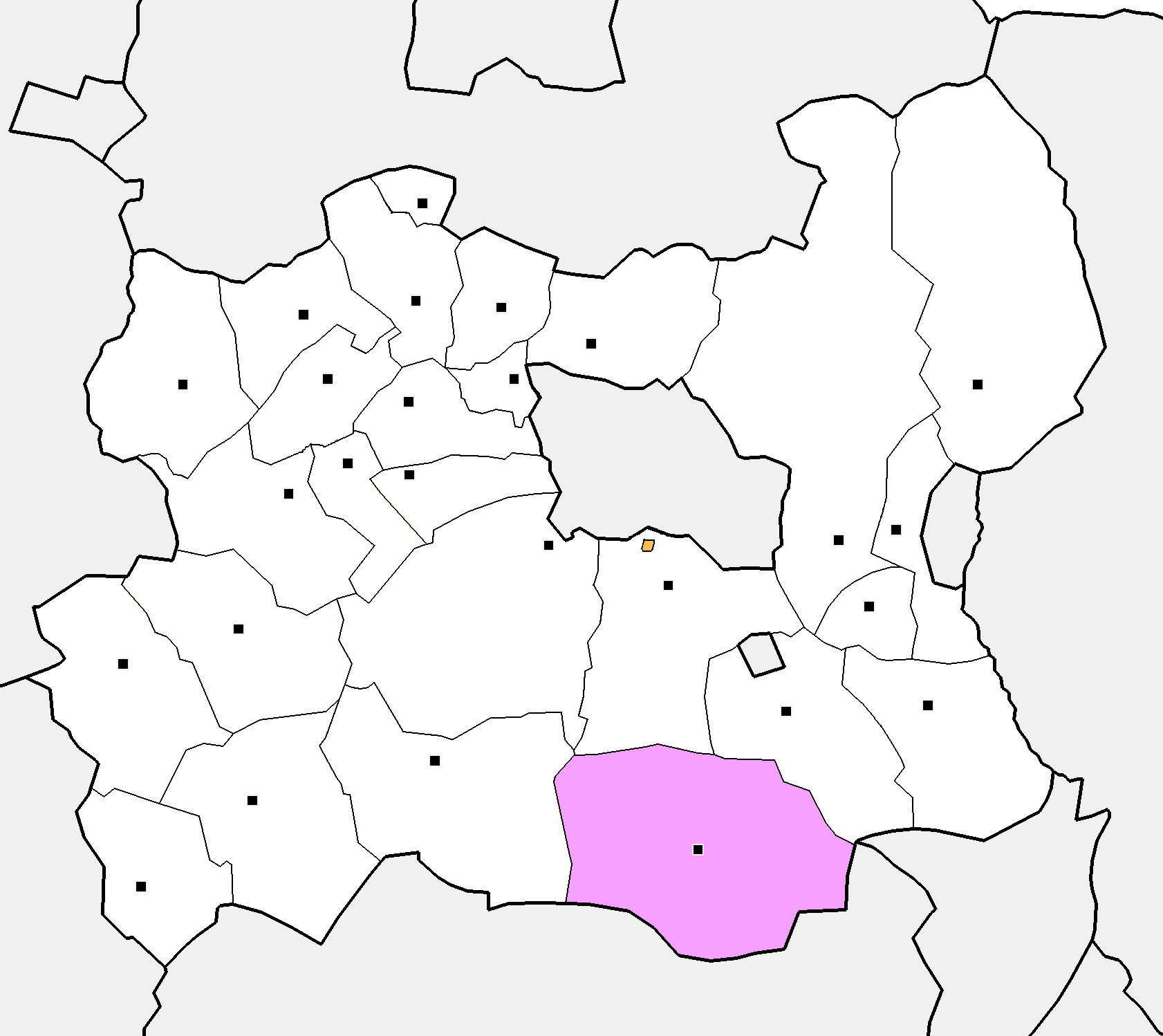
- Bayantsagaan District in Töv Province
- Country: Mongolia
- Province: Töv Province
- Time zone: UTC+8 (UTC + 8)

Bayantsagaan (Mongolian: Баянцагаан; lit. 'Rich White') is a district of Töv Province in Mongolia.

== Geography ==
The district (or sum) has a total area of 6,474 km^{2}.

== Administrative divisions ==
The district is divided into five bags, which are:

- Altat
- Bayan Airag
- Gurvan Turuu
- Ulziit
- Zogsool
