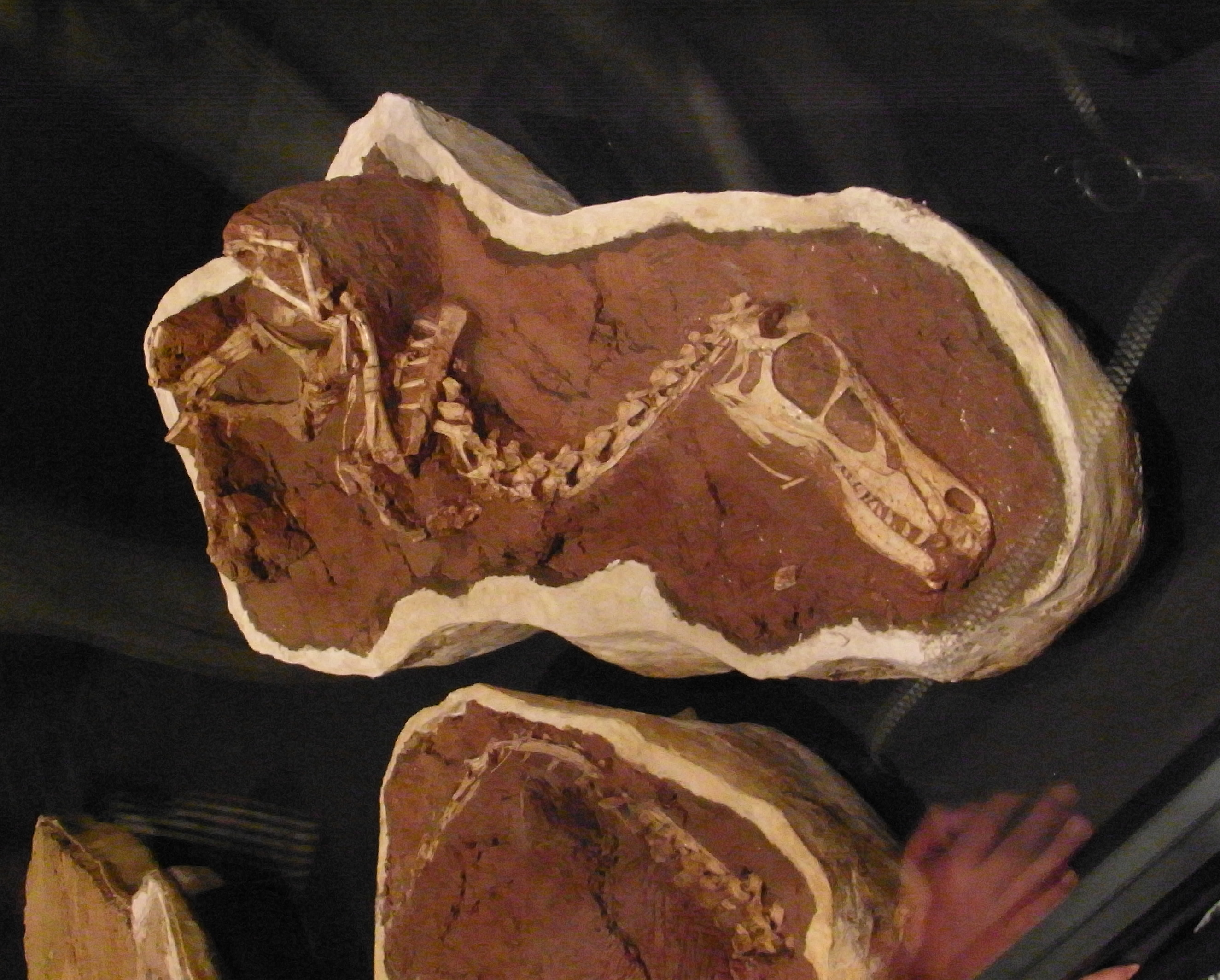
- Holotype fossil, IVPP V16923

Scientific classification
- Kingdom: Animalia
- Phylum: Chordata
- Class: Reptilia
- Clade: Dinosauria
- Clade: Saurischia
- Clade: Theropoda
- Family: †Dromaeosauridae
- Clade: †Eudromaeosauria
- Subfamily: †Velociraptorinae
- Genus: †Linheraptor; Xu et al., 2010
- Species: †L. exquisitus

Binomial name
- †Linheraptor exquisitus Xu et al., 2010

= Linheraptor =

Linheraptor Temporal range: Late Cretaceous, Campanian

Extinct genus of dinosaurs

Linheraptor is a genus of dromaeosaurid dinosaur which lived in what is now China in the Late Cretaceous. It was named by Xu Xing and colleagues in 2010, and contains the species Linheraptor exquisitus. This bird-like dinosaur was less than 2 m (6.5 ft) long and was found in Inner Mongolia. It is known from a single, nearly complete skeleton.

== Discovery ==
Researchers announced the discovery of the genus after a nearly complete fossilised skeleton was found in 2008 by Jonah N. Choiniere and Michael Pittman in Inner Mongolia; a more detailed publication is forthcoming. The specimen was recovered from rocks at Bayan Mandahu that belong to the Wulansuhai Formation. The latter includes lithologies that are very similar to the Mongolian Campanian-aged rocks of the Djadokhta Formation which have yielded the closely related dromaeosaurids Tsaagan and Velociraptor. The holotype specimen of Linheraptor, articulated and uncompressed, is one of the few nearly complete skeletons of dromaeosaurid dinosaurs worldwide. The name of the genus refers to the district of Linhe, Inner Mongolia, China where the specimen was discovered, while the specific name, exquisitus, refers to the well-preserved nature of the holotype (IVPP V 16923).

== Description ==
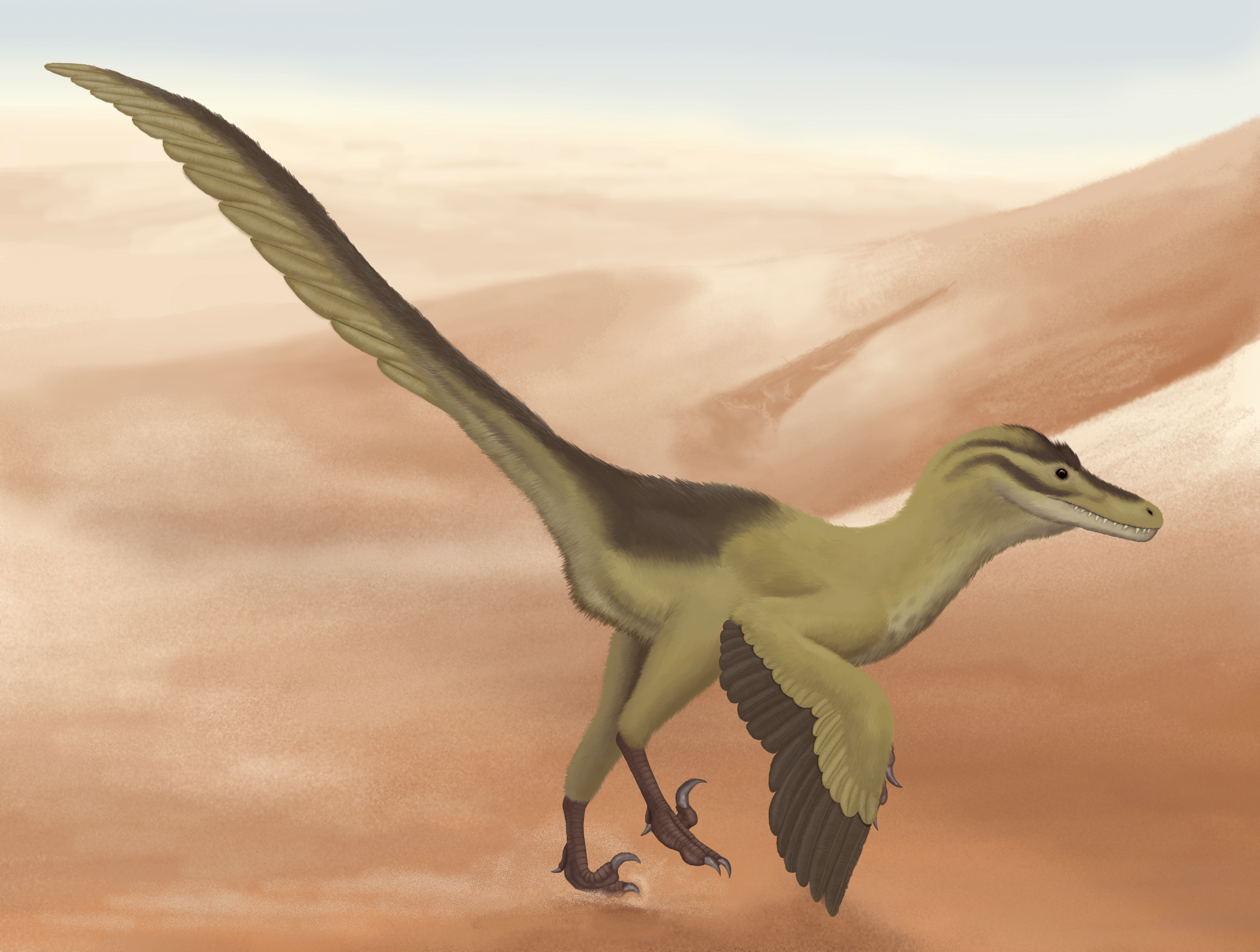
Life reconstruction of Linheraptor in its arid desert habitat.

Linheraptor was a bird-like theropod dinosaur. It was a dromaeosaurid which measured approximately 1.8 metres (5.9 ft) in length, and weighed up to approximately 25 kilograms (55 lb). At that size, Linheraptor would have been a fast and agile predator, perhaps preying on small ceratopsians. Like all dromaeosaurids, it had an elongated skull, a curved neck, an enlarged toe claw on each foot, and a long tail; Linheraptor was bipedal and carnivorous. The large toe claws may have been used for capturing prey.

== Taxonomy ==
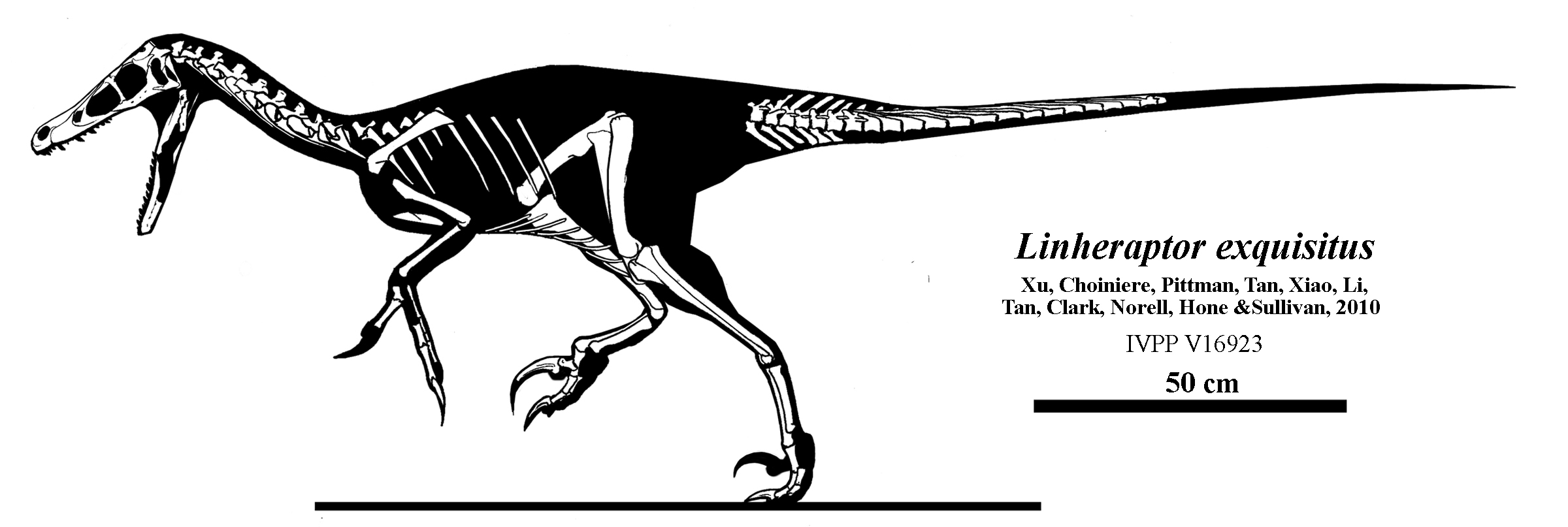
Skeletal restoration showing known elements

Among its sister taxa, Linheraptor is believed to be most closely related to Tsaagan mangas. Linheraptor and Tsaagan were intermediate between basal and derived dromaeosaurids. The two share several skull details, among which a large maxillary fenestra — an opening in the maxilla, an upper jaw bone — and lack various features of more derived dromaeosaurids such as Velociraptor. Senter (2011) and Turner, Makovicky and Norell (2012) argue that Linheraptor exquisitus is a junior synonym of Tsaagan mangas, but Xu, Pittman et al. (2015) reject this synonymy by responding to the counterarguments proposed using new and existing details of Linheraptor's anatomy. A monographic description of Linheraptor is currently in preparation.

== See also ==
- Timeline of dromaeosaurid research
