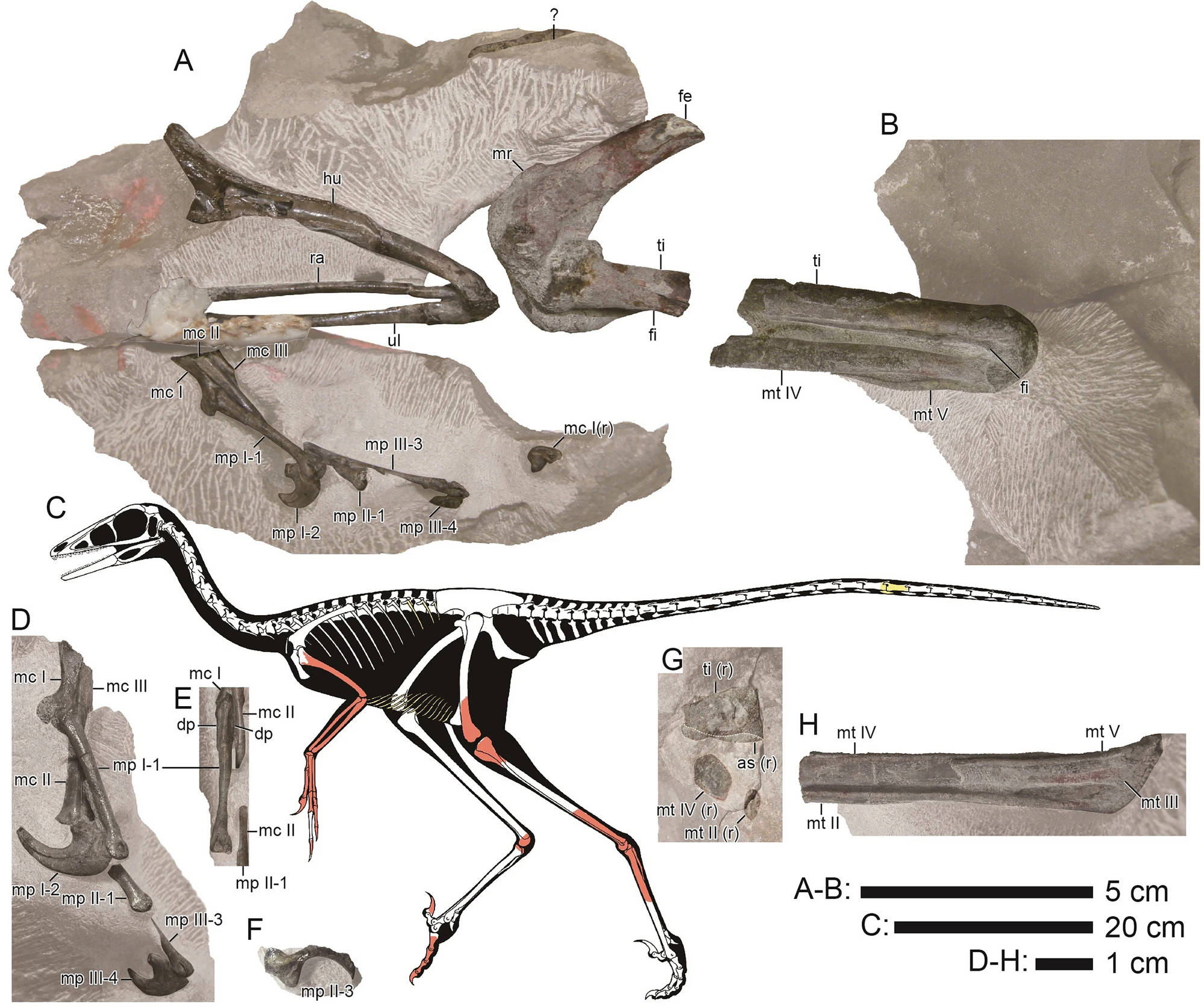
- Fossil remains and reconstructed skeleton of the holotype

Scientific classification
- Kingdom: Animalia
- Phylum: Chordata
- Class: Reptilia
- Clade: Dinosauria
- Clade: Saurischia
- Clade: Theropoda
- Family: †Troodontidae
- Subfamily: †Troodontinae
- Genus: †Hypnovenator; Kubota, Kobayashi & Ikeda, 2024
- Species: †H. matsubaraetoheorum

Binomial name
- †Hypnovenator matsubaraetoheorum Kubota, Kobayashi & Ikeda, 2024

= Hypnovenator =

Hypnovenator Temporal range: Early Cretaceous (early–middle Albian), 112.1–106.4 Ma

Genus of theropod dinosaurs

Hypnovenator (meaning "sleep hunter") is an extinct genus of troodontid theropod dinosaurs from the Early Cretaceous (Albian) Ohyamashimo Formation of Japan. The genus contains a single species, Hypnovenator matsubaraetoheorum, known from a partial skeleton. Hypnovenator is the only troodontid currently known from Japan, and it represents the oldest definitive member of the subgroup Troodontinae.

== Discovery and naming ==
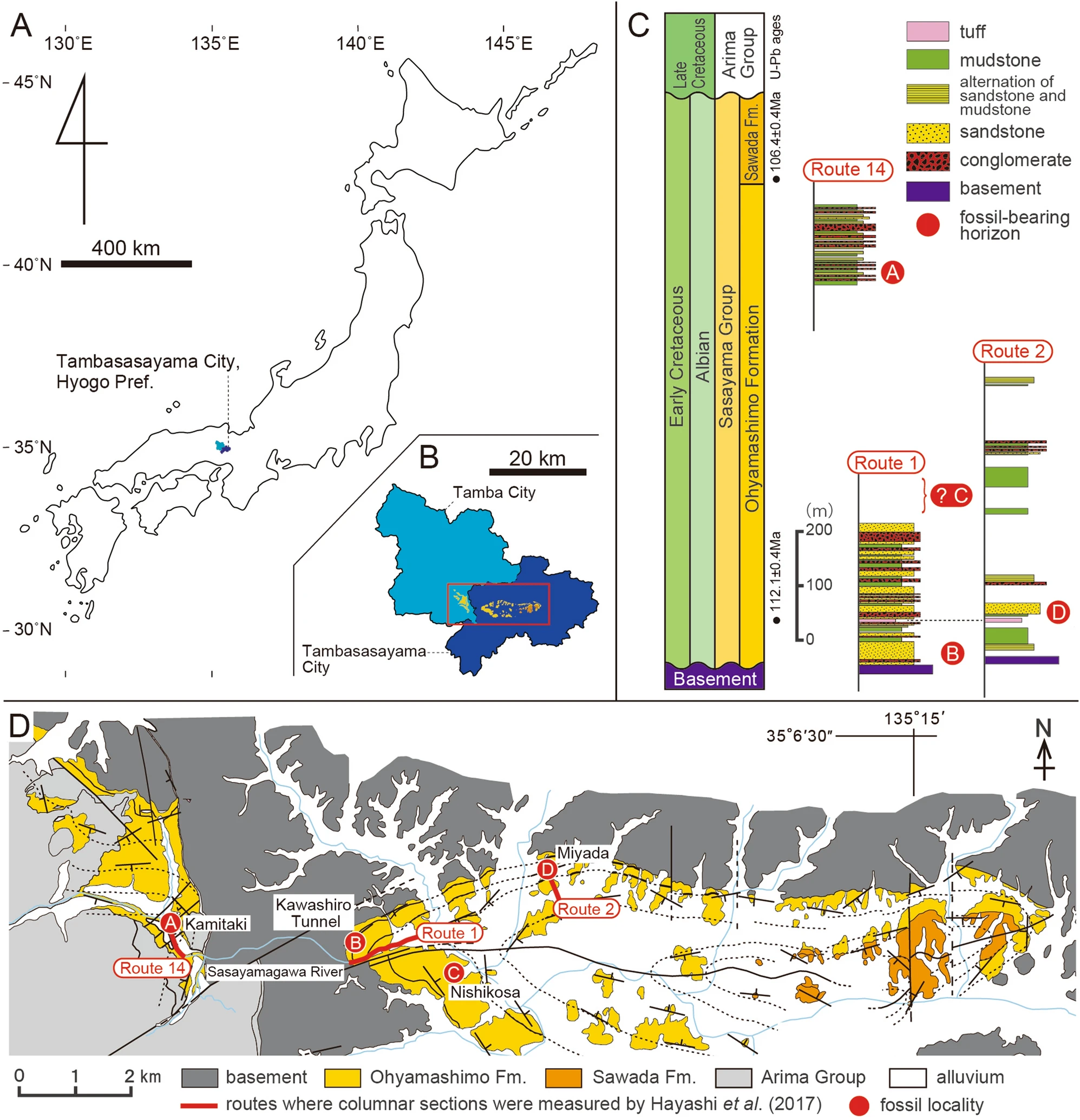
H. matsubaraetoheorum type locality

The Hypnovenator holotype specimen, MNHAH D1033340, was discovered in sediments of the Ohyamashimo Formation (lower Sasayama Group) in Nishikosa, Tamba-Sasayama city, of Hyōgo Prefecture, Japan. Much of the known material was discovered in September 2010 by a group of amateur fossil hunters during the construction of the Hyogo Prefectural Tamba Namikimichi Central Park. Subsequent expeditions in July of the following year by the prefecture's Museum of Nature and Human Activities revealed an additional block containing material belonging to the same individual. The specimen is somewhat fragmentary, comprising bones of both the axial and appendicular skeleton. These include two caudal vertebrae with a chevron, two ribs, several gastralia, most of the left arm—including the humerus, radius, ulna, carpal, metacarpals, and most of the phalanges and manual unguals—and some of the legs, including part of the left femur, tibia, and fibula, right tibia, both astragali, and several partial metatarsals and pedal phalanges (toe bones).

Size of Hypnovenator compared to a human

Prior to a formal description of the fossil material, it was mentioned in conference abstracts in 2012 and 2023.

In a Scientific Reports publication in mid-2024, Katsuhiro Kubota, Yoshitsugu Kobayashi, and Tadahiro Ikeda formally described Hypnovenator matsubaraetoheorum as a new genus and species of troodontid dinosaurs based on these fossil remains. The generic name, Hypnovenator, is combines the Ancient Greek word "hypnos", meaning "sleep", with the Latin word "venator", meaning "hunter", referencing the sleeping position the holotype was preserved in, similar to some Chinese troodontids like Mei and Sinornithoides. The specific name, matsubaraetoheorum, honors Kaoru Matsubara and Takaharu Ohe the discoverers of the Hypnovenator holotype.

Hypnovenator represents the twelfth validly named non-avian dinosaur described from Mainland Japan.

== Classification ==
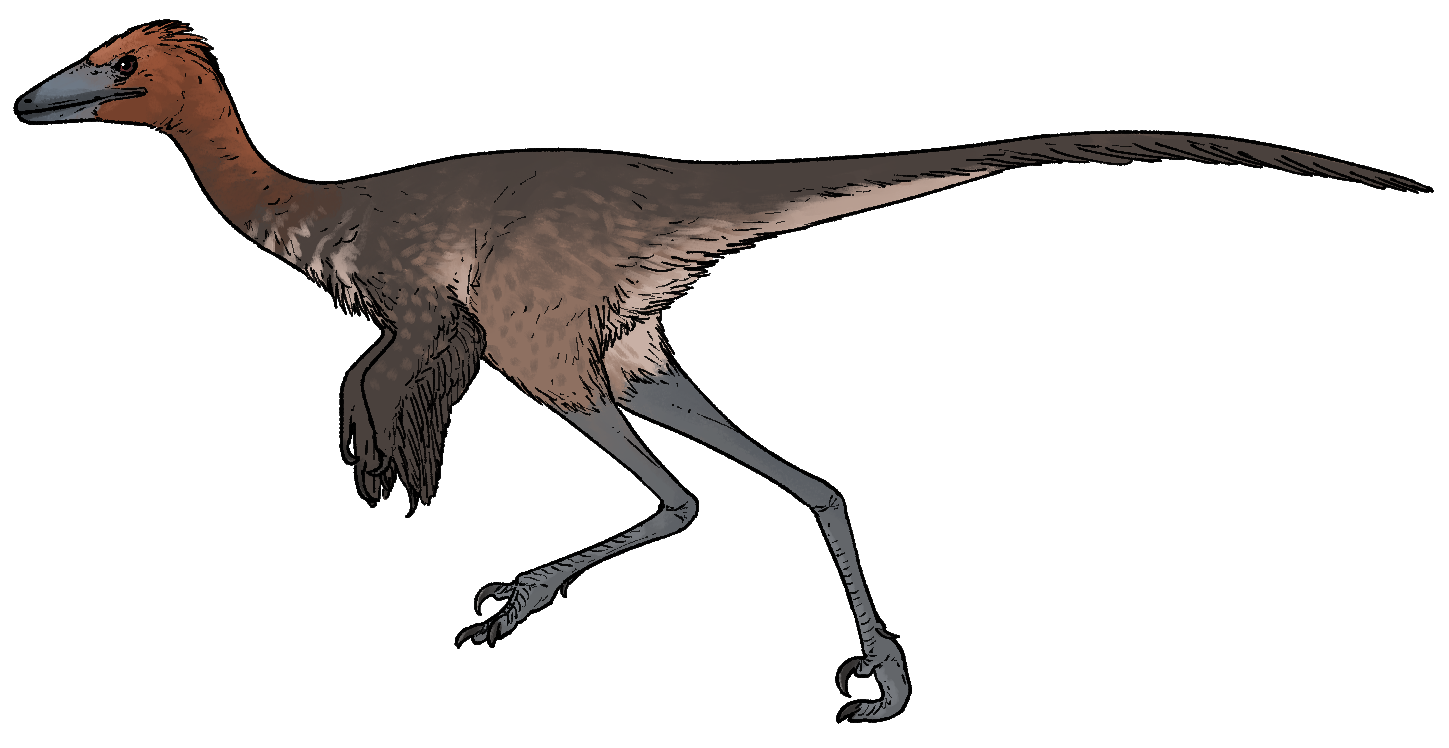
Speculative life restoration

Kubota and colleagues (2024) scored the Hypnovenator fossil material into the phylogenetic matrix of Sellés et al. (2021), itself a derivative of a large phylogenetic analysis intended to test the relationships of all major maniraptoromorph groups. Kubota et al. recovered it as a basal member of the Troodontinae, as the sister taxon of the younger Mongolian Gobivenator, making Hypnovenator the oldest known troodontine. Their results are displayed in the cladogram below:

- Troodontidae
  - Halszkaraptorinae
  - - - Liaoningvenator
      - MPC-D 100/1128 (Ukhaa Tolgod troodontid)
    - - MPC-D 100/44 ("EK troodontid")
      - - Sinovenatorinae
        - - - Sinusonasus
            - Xixiasaurus
          - - - Daliansaurus
              - Philovenator
              - Tochisaurus
              - - Almas ukhaa
                - MPC-D 100/972 + MPC-D 100/974 (Flaming Cliffs troodontid perinates)
            - - Geminiraptor
              - - - MPC-D 100/140 (Khamaryn Ar troodontid)
                  - Byronosaurus
                - - Sinornithoides
                  - Troodontinae
                    - - Hypnovenator
                      - Gobivenator
                    - - Urbacodon
                      - Saurornithoides
                      - Borogovia
                      - - Talos sampsoni
                        - - Zanabazar junior
                          - - Linhevenator
                            - Troodon

== Paleoecology ==
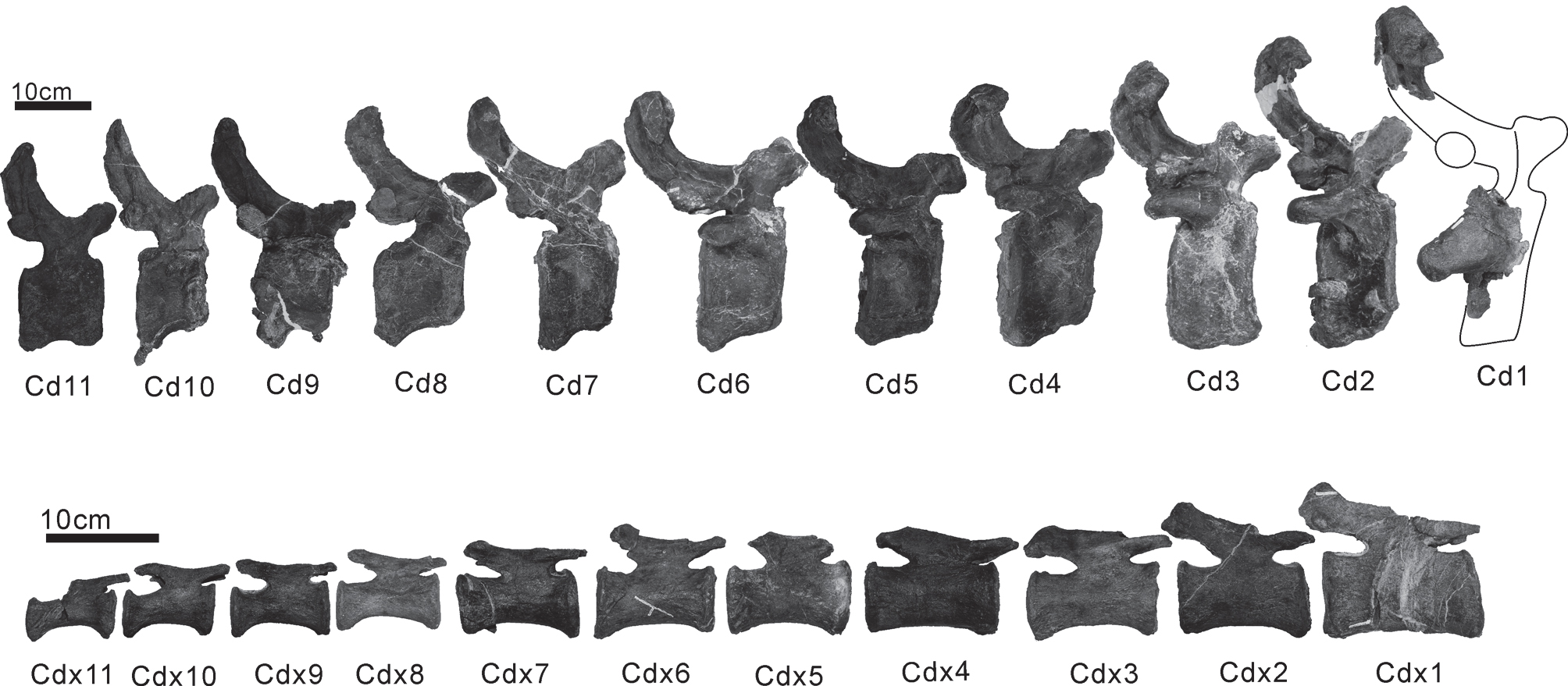
Caudal vertebrae of the contemporary Tambatitanis

Hypnovenator is known from the Ohyamashimo Formation (Sasayama Group), which dates to the early–middle Albian age from the end of the Early Cretaceous. These layers are predominantly made up by sandstones, mudstones, and conglomerates. The depositional environment represents a fluvial system with a subhumid to semi-arid climate.

Named dinosaur taxa from the formation include the neoceratopsian Sasayamagnomus and the titanosauriform sauropod Tambatitanis. The monstersaurian lizard Morohasaurus has also been described. Dinosaur teeth are common in various localities throughout this formation including those belonging to other theropods (dromaeosaurids, therizinosaurs, and tyrannosauroids) as well as sauropods, ankylosaurs, and iguanodontians. Several dinosaurian oospecies (egg fossils) have also described, including Himeoolithus, Subtiliolithus, Nipponoolithus, and Prismatoolithus. Although not specified as this formation in original descriptions, Sasayama Group have some other fossil fauna known, such as eutherian Sasayamamylos, scincomorph Pachygenys, two frogs Hyogobatrachus and Tambabatrachus.

== See also ==
- Timeline of troodontid research
- 2024 in archosaur paleontology
