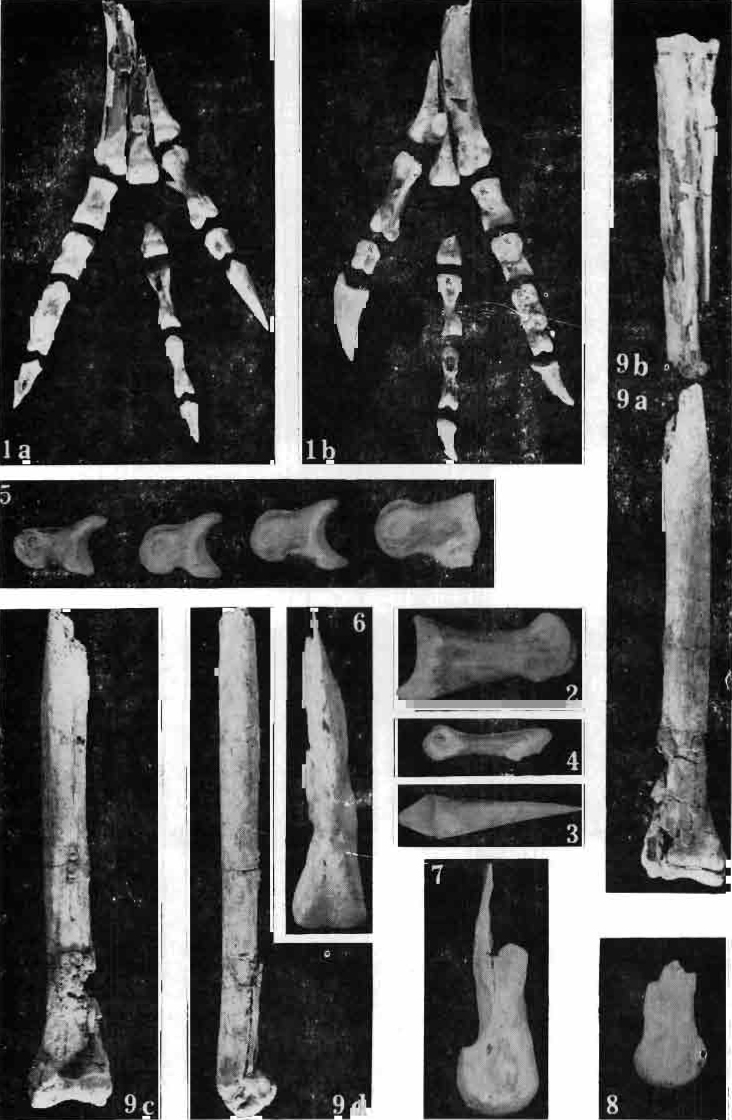
- Leg bones of the holotype

Scientific classification
- Kingdom: Animalia
- Phylum: Chordata
- Class: Reptilia
- Clade: Dinosauria
- Clade: Saurischia
- Clade: Theropoda
- Family: †Troodontidae
- Genus: †Borogovia; Osmólska, 1987

Type species
- †Borogovia gracilicrus Osmólska, 1987

= Borogovia =

Borogovia Temporal range: Late Cretaceous, Maastrichtian

Extinct genus of dinosaurs

Borogovia is a troodontid theropod dinosaur genus which lived during the Late Cretaceous Period, in what is now Mongolia. It contains one species, Borogovia gracilicrus.

== Discovery and naming ==
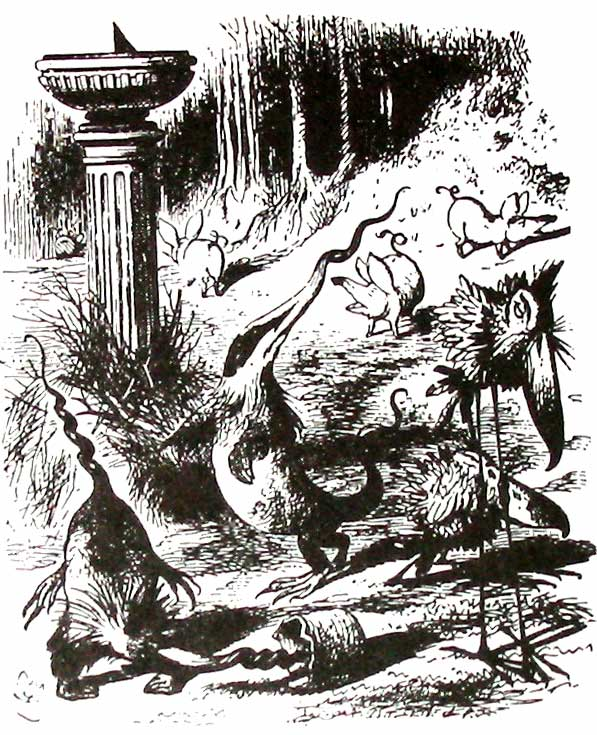
The generic name Borogovia is derived from the 'borogoves'

In 1971, a Polish-Mongolian expedition discovered the remains of a small theropod at the Altan Uul IV site, in the Nemegt Basin of Ömnögovĭ province. In 1982, upon describing Hulsanpes perlei, the find was reported by Halszka Osmólska and considered by her to be a possible specimen of Saurornithoides. Later she concluded that it represented a species new to science.

In 1987, Osmólska named and described the type species Borogovia gracilicrus. The generic name is derived from the fantasy creatures known as 'borogoves' in the Lewis Carroll poem "Jabberwocky" in Through the Looking-Glass. The specific name is a combination of Latin gracilis, "lightly built", and crus, "shin", in reference to the elegant build of the lower leg.

== Description ==
The holotype specimen, ZPAL MgD-I/174, was found in the Nemegt Formation, dating from the early Maastrichtian. It consists of two lower legs of a single individual, including fragments of both tibiotarsi, the undersides of both metatarsi, and the second, third, and fourth toes of each foot.

The tibiotarsi have an estimated length of twenty-eight centimetres. Borogovia is about two meters (6 feet) long, weighing some twenty kilograms (forty-five pounds). The tibiotarsus is very elongated. The third toe is narrow. The second phalanx of the second toe is short. The claw of the second toe is short and relatively flat. Osmólska claimed that the second toe could not be hyperextended and suggested that it had regained a weight-bearing function, compensating for the weakness of the third toe. In 2021, Andrea Cau and Daniel Madzia have called the "sickle-clawed" second toe found in other troodontids, and also found in dromaeosaurids, but is absent in Borogovia the "falciphoran condition".

== Classification ==
Osmólska (1987) assigned Borogovia to the Troodontidae in 1987, noting that it may be a junior synonym of Saurornithoides. In the 2021 description of Tamarro, Sellés et al. recovered Borogovia as a member of the Troodontinae, closely related to Saurornithoides. Later in 2021, Cau and Madzia revised material of Borogovia and recovered it as a sister taxon to Troodontinae.

Sellés et al., 2021

- Troodontidae
  - - - Sinovenatorinae
        - Jianianhualong
        - - Sinovenator
          - - Xiaotingia
            - Mei
      - Jinfengopteryginae
        - Jinfengopteryx
        - - Liaoningvenator
          - - Philovenator
            - - IGM 100/1128
              - IGM 100/140
              - Tamarro
    - - IGM10044
      - - - - Xixiasaurus
            - Sinusonasus
          - - Tochisaurus
            - Daliansaurus
        - - Gobivenator
          - Troodontinae
            - - Sinornithoides
              - Byronosaurus
            - - Zanabazar
              - Urbacodon
              - - Saurornithoides
                - Borogovia
              - - Troodon
                - - Linhevenator
                  - Talos

Cau & Madzia, 2021

- Troodontidae
  - - Sinovenatorinae
      - Jinfengopteryx
      - - Ningyuansaurus
        - - Sinovenator
          - Mei
    - - - Sinusonasus
        - Sinornithoides
      - - - Jianianhualong
          - - Hesperornithoides
            - - Daliansaurus
              - - MPC-D 100/44
                - Luanchuanraptor
                - Liaoningvenator
        - - Byronosaurus
          - - Borogovia
            - Troodontinae
              - - Xixiasaurus
                - - Zanabazar
                  - Saurornithoides
              - - Albertavenator
                - Talos
                - Stenonychosaurus
                - Gobivenator
                - Almas
                - - Philovenator
                  - Linhevenator

== See also ==
- Timeline of troodontid research
