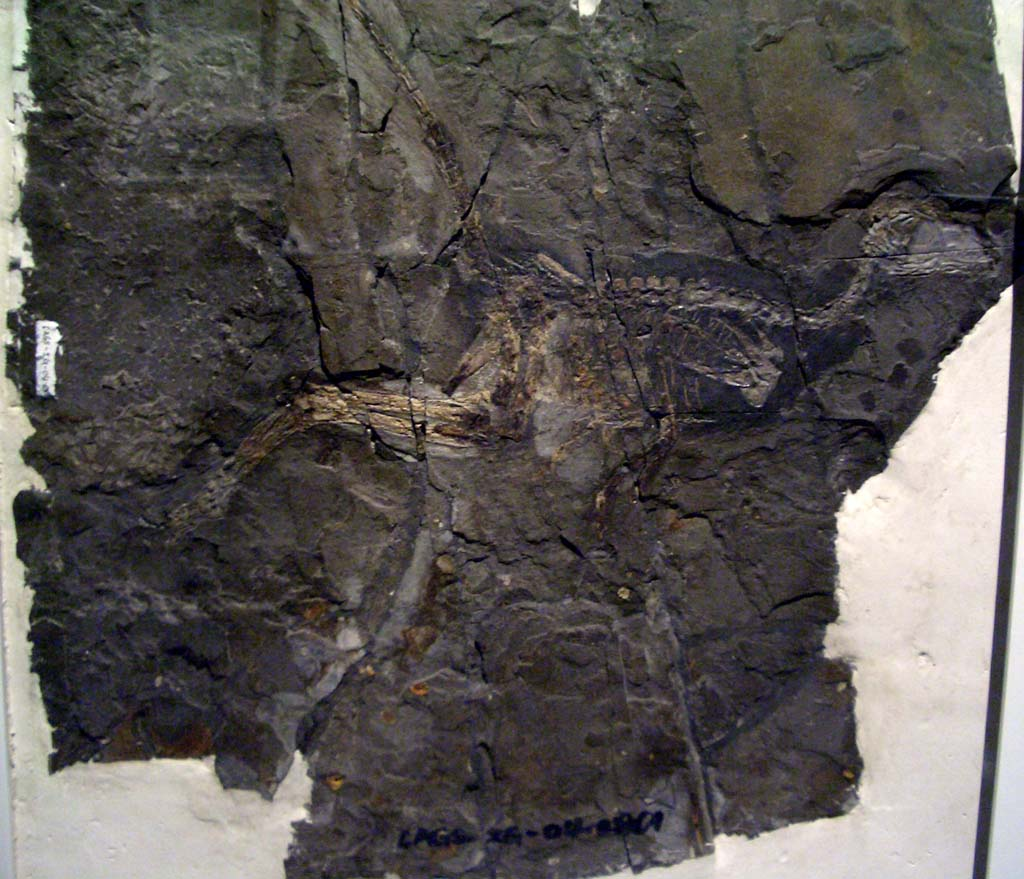
- Holotype of the type species, Jinfengopteryx elegans

Scientific classification
- Kingdom: Animalia
- Phylum: Chordata
- Class: Reptilia
- Clade: Dinosauria
- Clade: Saurischia
- Clade: Theropoda
- Family: †Troodontidae
- Subfamily: †Jinfengopteryginae; Turner et al., 2012

Type species
- †Jinfengopteryx elegans Ji et al., 2005

Genera
- †Almas ukhaa?; †Liaoningvenator?; †Philovenator?; †Tamarro; †Jinfengopteryx

= Jinfengopteryginae =

Jinfengopterygines Temporal range: Early Cretaceous–Late Cretaceous, 122–66 Ma

Extinct subfamily of dinosaurs

Jinfengopteryginae is a subfamily of bird-like theropod dinosaurs known from the Cretaceous of Eurasia. This group includes relatively few genera, with members discovered in 2005 but the name erected in 2012. Like other troodontids, this group of dinosaurs resided in the Paraves potentially close to the Avialae.

== Description ==
Jinfengopterygines were relatively small sized troodontids ranging from about 0.5–2 m (1.8–6.6 ft), and like other troodontids had a pair of sickle claws on each foot. These animals were feathered, as most troodontids presumably were, as shown in the type species, with typical feathering around the body and neck and especially long, vaned feathers spanning the tail. Studies on these animals' flight capabilities have determined that they would be approximately as proficient as Microraptor and Rahonavis. Although most other troodontids are believed to be primarily carnivorous, specimens of this subfamily show potential omnivory, being what are possibly plant seeds in the gut of Jinfengopteryx, although these have also been interpreted to be developing eggs or pennaceous follicles. However, omnivory in troodontids is not unheard of, as studies on jaw morphology in Troodon suggest.

== History of classification ==
The first representative of this group, Jinfengopteryx elegans, was discovered in the Huajiying Formation in Hebei, China in 2005, dating approximately 122 million years old. Upon discovery, it was thought to be a member of the Archaeopterygidae, being the most basal avian alongside Archaeopteryx and the dubious Wellnhoferia, and was further maintained as belonging to the family in 2007. In 2006, Chiappe, Xu, and Norell suggested that it belonged to the Troodontidae based on the presence of an enlarged second toe claw, general body plan, and dental morphology. Jinfengopteryx was subsequently placed in the Troodontidae in 2007 in an analysis of the relationships between troodontids, dromaeosaurids, and early birds by Turner and Norell et al.

Finally, in 2012, Turner, Makovicky, and Norell erected the subfamily Jinfengopteryginae to include Jinfengopteryx and the as-of-yet unnamed specimen IGM 100/1226, with large antorbital fenestrae and a bifurcated jugal being the group's synapomorphies. In 2014, Brusatte, Lloyd, Wang, and Norell published an analysis on Coelurosauria, based on data from Turner et al. (2012), including many basal troodontid species but failing to resolve many interrelationships resulting in a polytomy between IGM 100/44, Byronosaurus, Xixiasaurus, Sinovenatorinae, Jinfengopteryginae, and the derived Sinornithoides+Troodontinae clade. This analysis was added onto in 2017 by Shen et al. after the discovery of Daliansaurus, who included more taxa and reduced polytomies. Their analysis of Deinonychosauria is shown below:

- Deinonychosauria
  - Dromaeosauridae
  - Troodontidae
    - - Eosinopteryx
      - Anchiornis
      - - Aurornis
        - Xiaotingia
    - - IGM 100/44
      - Byronosaurus
      - Xixiasaurus
      - Jinfengopteryginae
        - IGM 100/1323 (Almas)
        - - IGM 100/1128
          - Jinfengopteryx
      - Sinovenatorinae
        - Mei
        - - Sinovenator
          - - Daliansaurus
            - Sinusonasus
      - - Sinornithoides
        - - Troodon
          - - Zanabazar
            - Saurornithoides

In a 2021 phylogenetic analysis by Sellés et al. after the discovery of Tamarro, the second member referred to this group, Jinfengopteryginae was found to be the sister group to Sinovenatorinae, and Liaoningvenator, Philovenator, and the unnamed specimens IGM 100/1128 and IGM 100/140 were found to belong to this group as well. Their findings are as follows:

- Troodontidae
  - Geminiraptor
  - Hesperornithoides
  - - - Sinovenatorinae
      - Jinfengopteryginae
        - Jinfengopteryx
        - - Liaoningvenator
          - - Philovenator
            - - IGM 100/1128
              - IGM 100/140
              - Tamarro
    - - IGM 100/44
      - - - - Xixiasaurus
            - Sinusonasus
          - - Tochisaurus
            - Daliansaurus
        - - Gobivenator
          - Troodontinae

== See also ==
- Troodontidae
- Jinfengopteryx
- Tamarro
