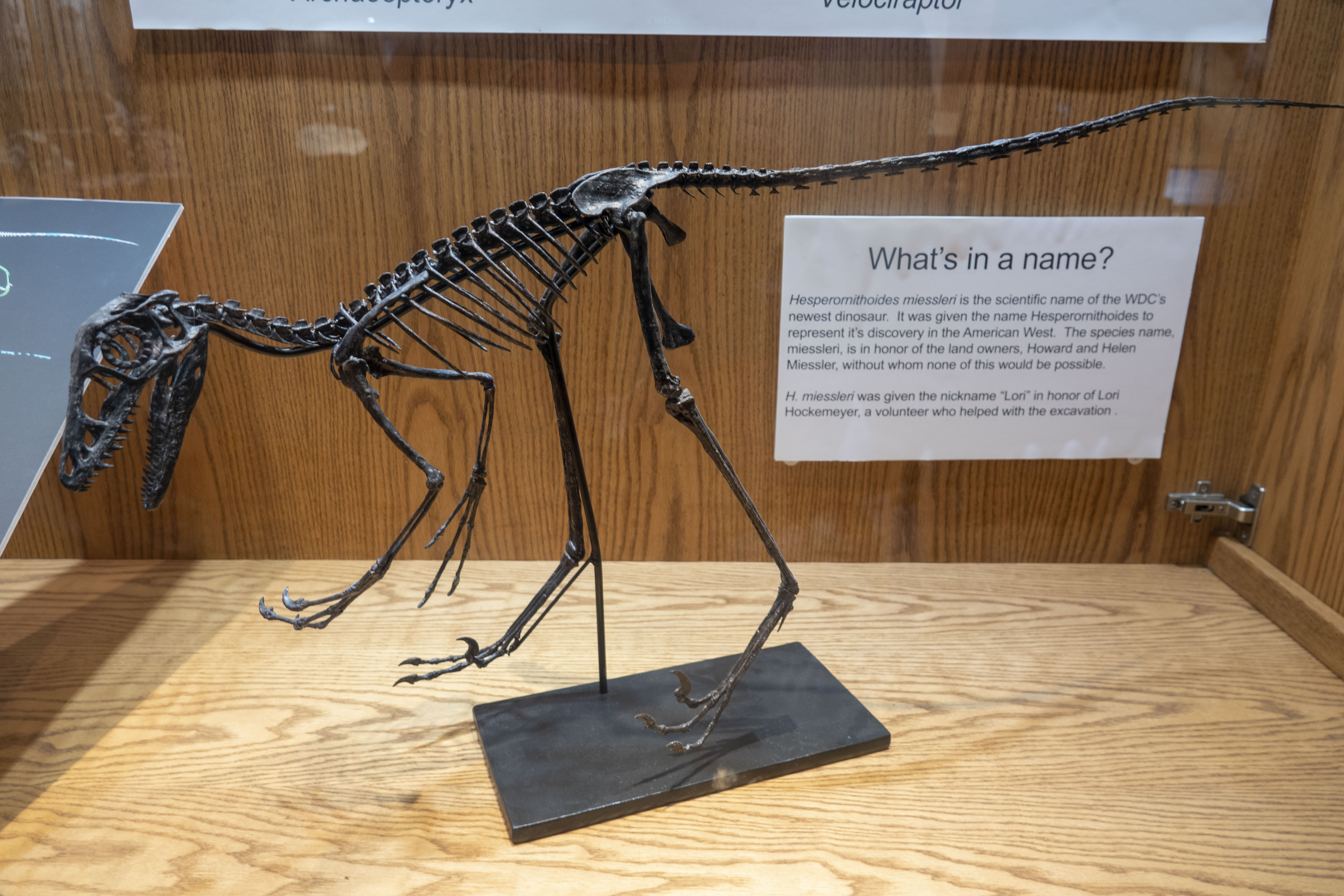
- Reconstructed skeleton, Wyoming Dinosaur Center

Scientific classification
- Kingdom: Animalia
- Phylum: Chordata
- Class: Reptilia
- Clade: Dinosauria
- Clade: Saurischia
- Clade: Theropoda
- Family: †Troodontidae
- Genus: †Hesperornithoides; Hartman et al., 2019
- Species: †H. miessleri

Binomial name
- †Hesperornithoides miessleri Hartman et al., 2019

= Hesperornithoides =

Hesperornithoides Temporal range: Late Jurassic, ~Oxfordian–Tithonian

Extinct genus of dinosaurs

Hesperornithoides (meaning "western bird form"; nicknamed "Lori") is a genus of troodontid theropod dinosaur that lived in North America during the Late Jurassic period.

== Discovery ==
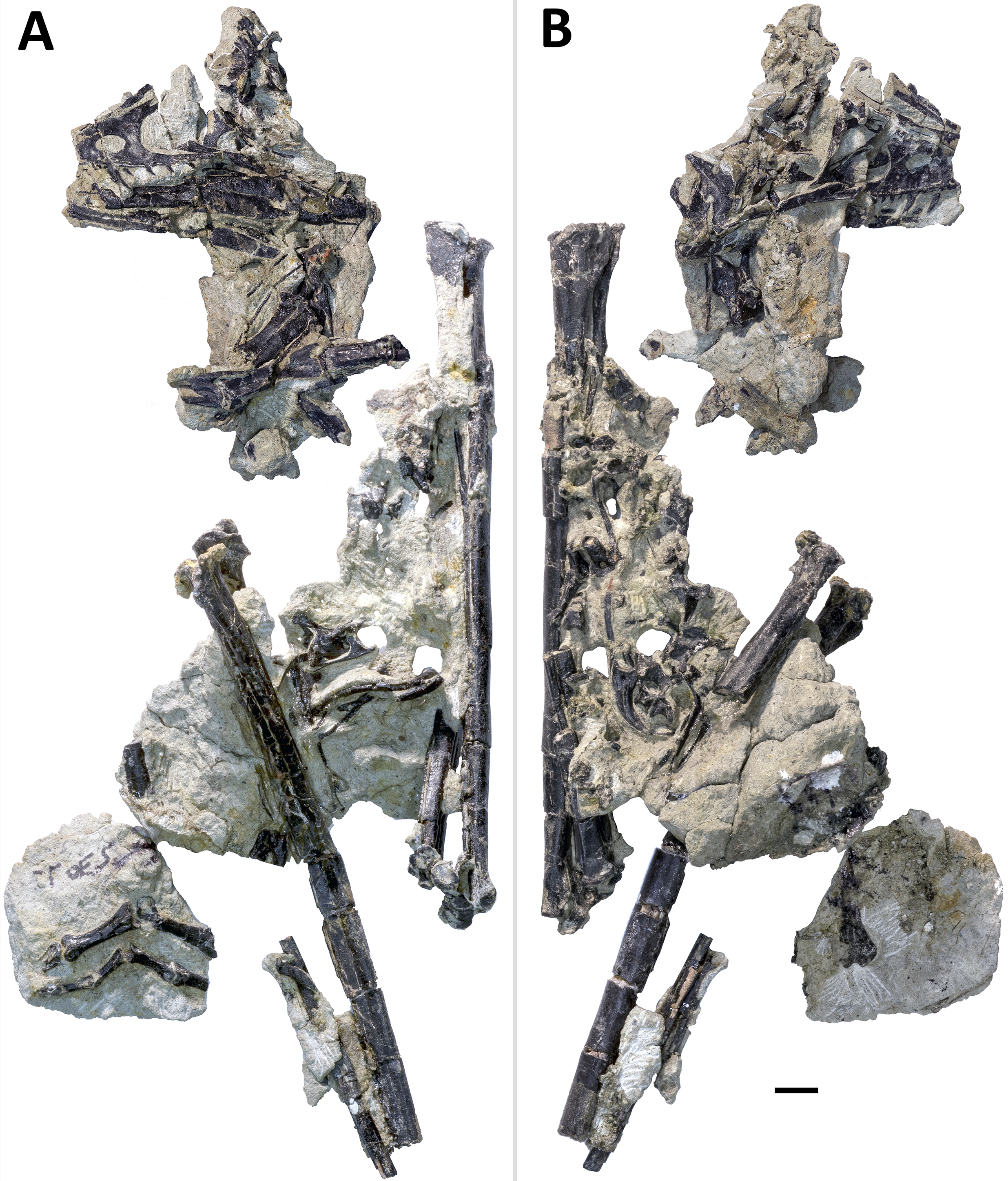
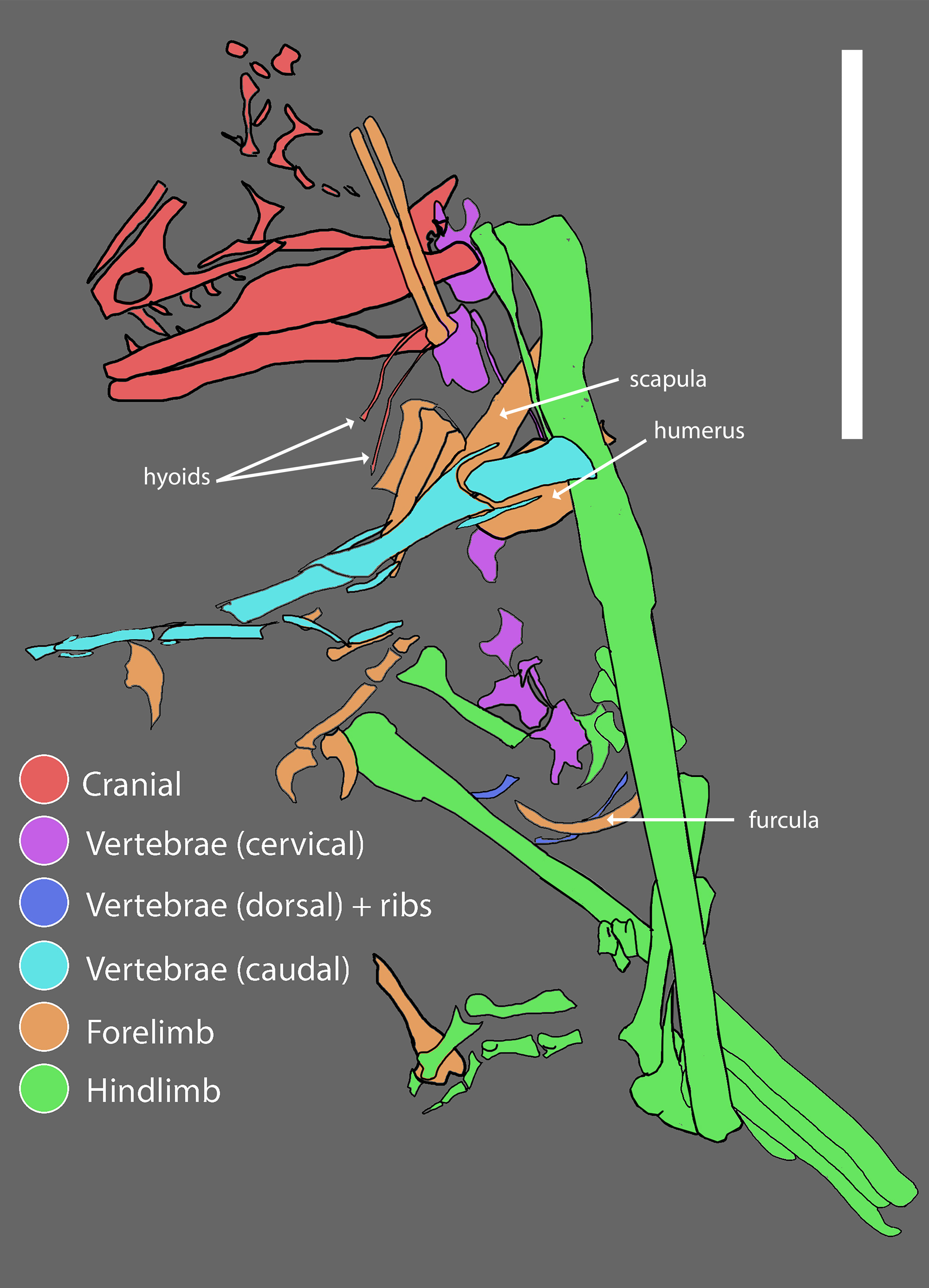
Main blocks of the holotype (right), and interpretative diagram (left)

Although several troodontid teeth were found in the Morrison Formation, with the genus Koparion named in 1994, a well preserved skeleton wasn't found until in 2001, a field crew from the Tate Geological Museum supervised by William Wahl unexpectedly discovered the type skeleton Hesperornithoides in Jimbo Quarry, overlying the excavation site of Supersaurus vivianae, near Douglas, Wyoming. The muddy sandstone layers of the Jimbo Quarry from which Hesperornithoides came from the middle Morrison Formation dating to between the Oxfordian and Tithonian ages of the Upper Jurassic. The accidental discovery of the skeleton led to some of the fossils being damaged or lost. The holotype, WYDICE-DML-001 consists of a semi-articulated partial skeleton of a subadult or adult including: the rear skull and lower jaws, hyoid bones, five cervical vertebrae, the first dorsal vertebra, twelve caudal vertebrae, a rib, chevrons, the left shoulder girdle, the right humerus, the left arm, a femur fragment, and the left and right lower legs minus the right toes.

Its discovery was announced at the 2003 annual meeting of the Society of Vertebrate Paleontology and in 2005, a phylogenetic analysis including it was presented in an abstract for the Journal of Vertebrate Paleontology. The same year the specimen was donated to the Big Horn Basin Foundation which in 2016 joined the Wyoming Dinosaur Center. In 2019, the type species Hesperornithoides miessleri was named and described by Scott Hartman, Mickey Mortimer, William Wahl, Dean R. Lomax, Jessica Lippincott and David M. Lovelace in an article published on PeerJ. The generic name is derived from the Greek Ἑσπερίς, Hesperis, "western", ὄρνις, ornis, "bird", and ~eides, "form". The specific name honours the Miessler family for its support of the project.

== Description ==
Size comparison (1 meter estimate)

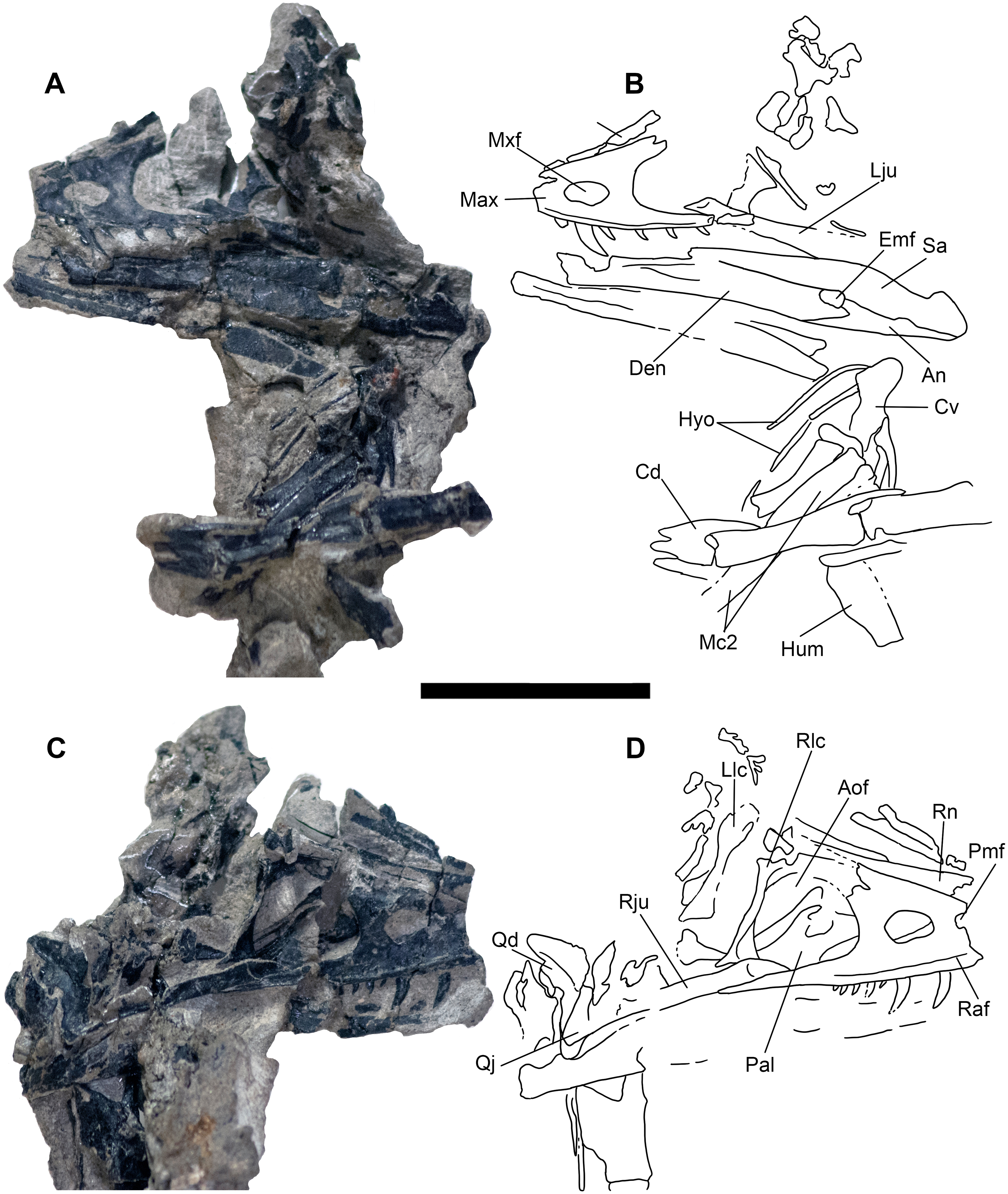
Block containing the skull

The length of the holotype individual was in 2019 estimated at 89 cm (35 in) long. Such a body size is rather limited for a troodontid. The specimen may represent an adult or subadult individual, due to the lack of cranial and body proportions associated with juvenile individuals. Nevertheless, either assignation would not be much different; for instance, the estimated 89 cm (35 in) would become 1 m (3.3 ft).

The describing authors established some derived or apomorphic traits relative to the Paraves. The jugal bone is pneumatised. The rear branch of the lacrimal bone is short, with less than 15% of the length of the descending branch, measured from the inner corner downwards. The quadrate bone is part of the outer edge of the foramen paraquadraticum. In the lower jaw the external side opening is small, with less than an eighth of the length of the jaw as a whole. On the humerus, the ridge towards the inner condyle represents more than 15% of the total distal width of the element. The third claw of the hand is about as large as the second claw. The lower inner corner of the shinbone projects to the front.

== Classification ==
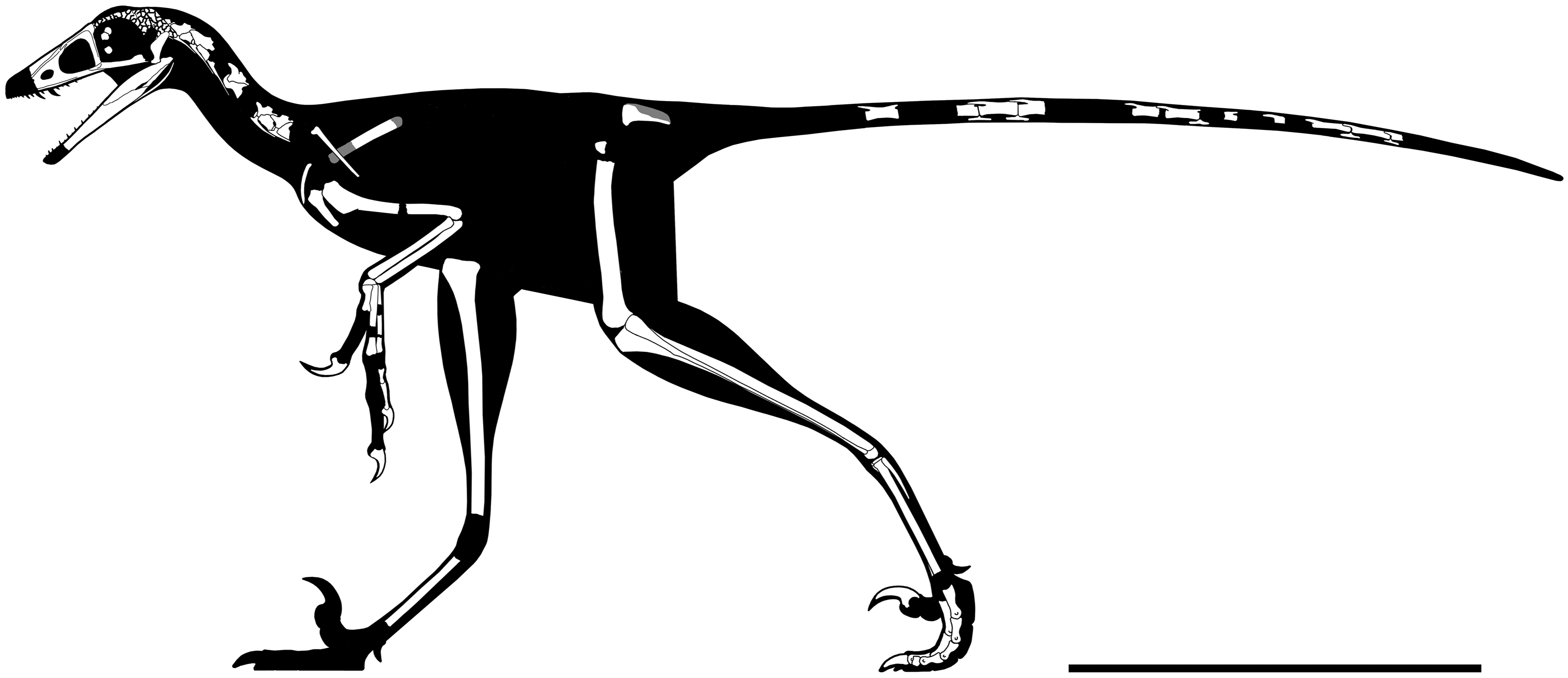
Skeletal reconstruction of the holotype

The phylogenetic analysis of 2005 placed the specimen as a close relative of Sinornithoides. Unpublished phylogenetic results presented at the SVP 2017 conference recovered Hesperornithoides (then known by the informal name "Lori") as a relative of Sinovenator. The presence of this derived maniraptoran along with several others, such as Anchiornis and Eosinopteryx, in Jurassic sediments was a strong refutation of the temporal paradox argument used by those who oppose the consensus view that birds evolved from dinosaurs.

In 2019, Hesperornithoides was placed in the Troodontidae, in a relatively basal position, in a clade with Daliansaurus, Xixiasaurus and Sinusonasus, as shown in the cladogram below:

- Troodontidae
  - Sinovenatorinae
  - - Almas
    - Liaoningvenator
    - - - - Hesperornithoides
          - - Xixiasaurus
            - Sinusonasus
        - Daliansaurus
      - "Derived troodontids"

== Palaeobiology ==
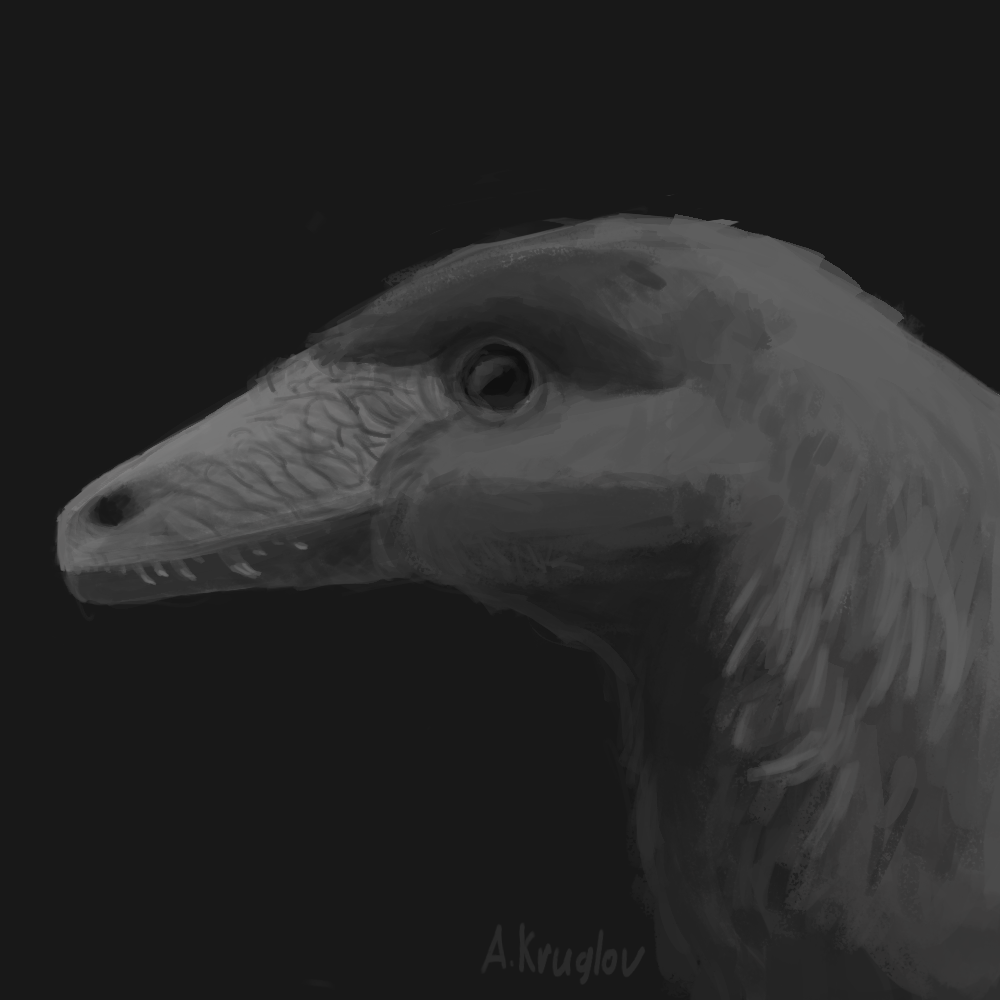
Hesperornithoides portrait

Many large dinosaurs have been discovered in the Morrison Formation during the nineteenth century; Hesperornithoides proves that the full wealth of species had not yet been revealed. It lived in a relatively open well-watered landscape with low growths but few trees, or, lacustrine and wetland environments.

The layers of the Jimbo Quarry have been interpreted as a marginal lacustrine or wetland environment, representing a cyclical rise and fall in water layers. Notably, the specimen preserves some keratin sheaths on the distal end of several pedal and manual unguals. The relative positioning of the thoracic elements of the skeleton suggests the animal was in a resting pose and the wetland environment from which the fossil was found suggests a wetland paleoecology.

Apart from the Avialae, most paravian groups had only few members with some flight capability. The exceptions all showed adaptations for an arboreal lifestyle, indicating flight developed multiple times when species evolved traits and behaviours useful for climbing trees or other more vertical surfaces, such as wing-assisted incline running.

== See also ==
- Timeline of troodontid research
- Morrison Formation
- 2019 in paleontology
