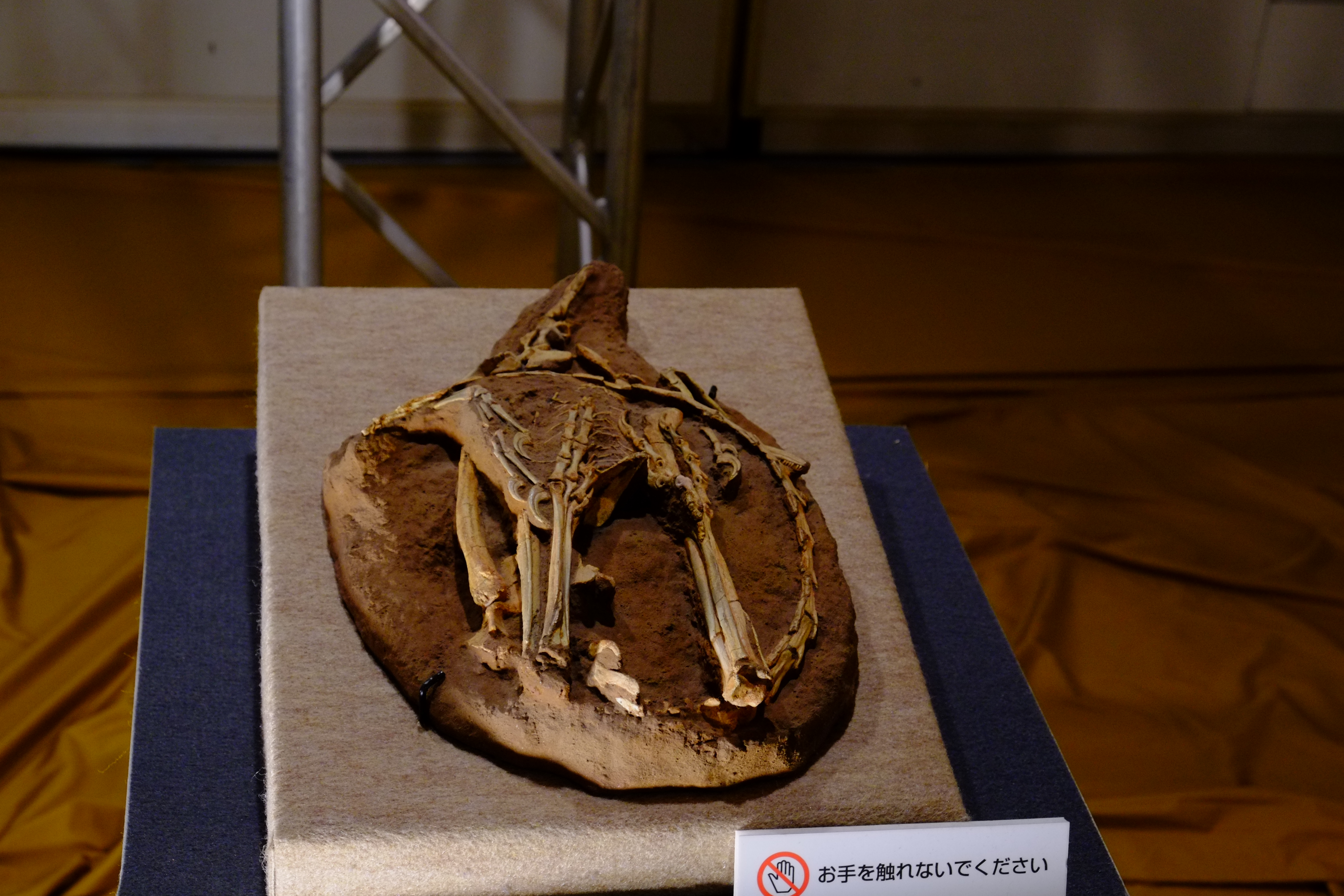
- Fossil

Scientific classification
- Kingdom: Animalia
- Phylum: Chordata
- Class: Reptilia
- Clade: Dinosauria
- Clade: Saurischia
- Clade: Theropoda
- Family: †Troodontidae
- Genus: †Sinornithoides; Russell & Dong, 1993
- Species: †S. youngi

Binomial name
- †Sinornithoides youngi Russell & Dong, 1993

= Sinornithoides =

Sinornithoides Temporal range: Early Cretaceous, 113 Ma

Extinct genus of dinosaurs

Sinornithoides (meaning "Chinese bird form") is a genus of troodontid theropod dinosaurs that lived during the Early Cretaceous (Aptian or Albian stage, around 113 million years ago) of Inner Mongolia, China. It contains only a single species, S. youngi. Sinornithoides measured approximately 1 metre (3.3 ft) long, and probably ate invertebrates and other small prey.

== Discovery ==
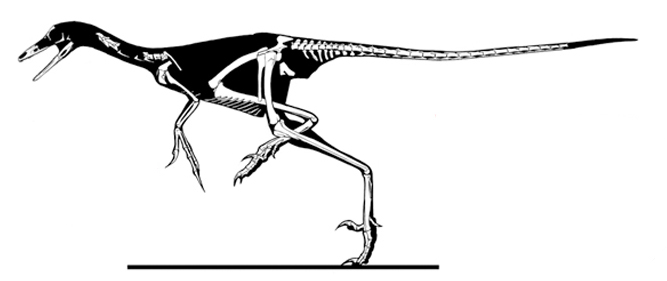
Skeletal restoration

In 1988, a Chinese-Canadian expedition discovered the remains of a small theropod near Huamuxiao, in the Ordos Basin of Inner Mongolia. Sinornithoides youngi, the type species, was named and described in 1993/1994 by Dale Russell and Dong Zhiming based on this fossil specimen from the Lower Cretaceous Ejinhoro Formation. The generic name is derived from Latin Sinae, "Chinese", and Greek ὄρνις, ornis, "bird", en ~ειδής, ~eides, a suffix meaning "~like", in reference to the bird-like build. The specific name honours Yang Zhongjian.

It is represented by a holotype, IVPP V9612, an almost complete skeleton with skull, which is articulated and nearly complete except for the roof of the skull, some cervical and many dorsal vertebrae, along with some other referred skeletal elements. The holotype is preserved in much the same roosting position as another troodontid fossil, that of Mei long, with its snout tucked under its left hand. It represents a subadult individual.

== Description ==
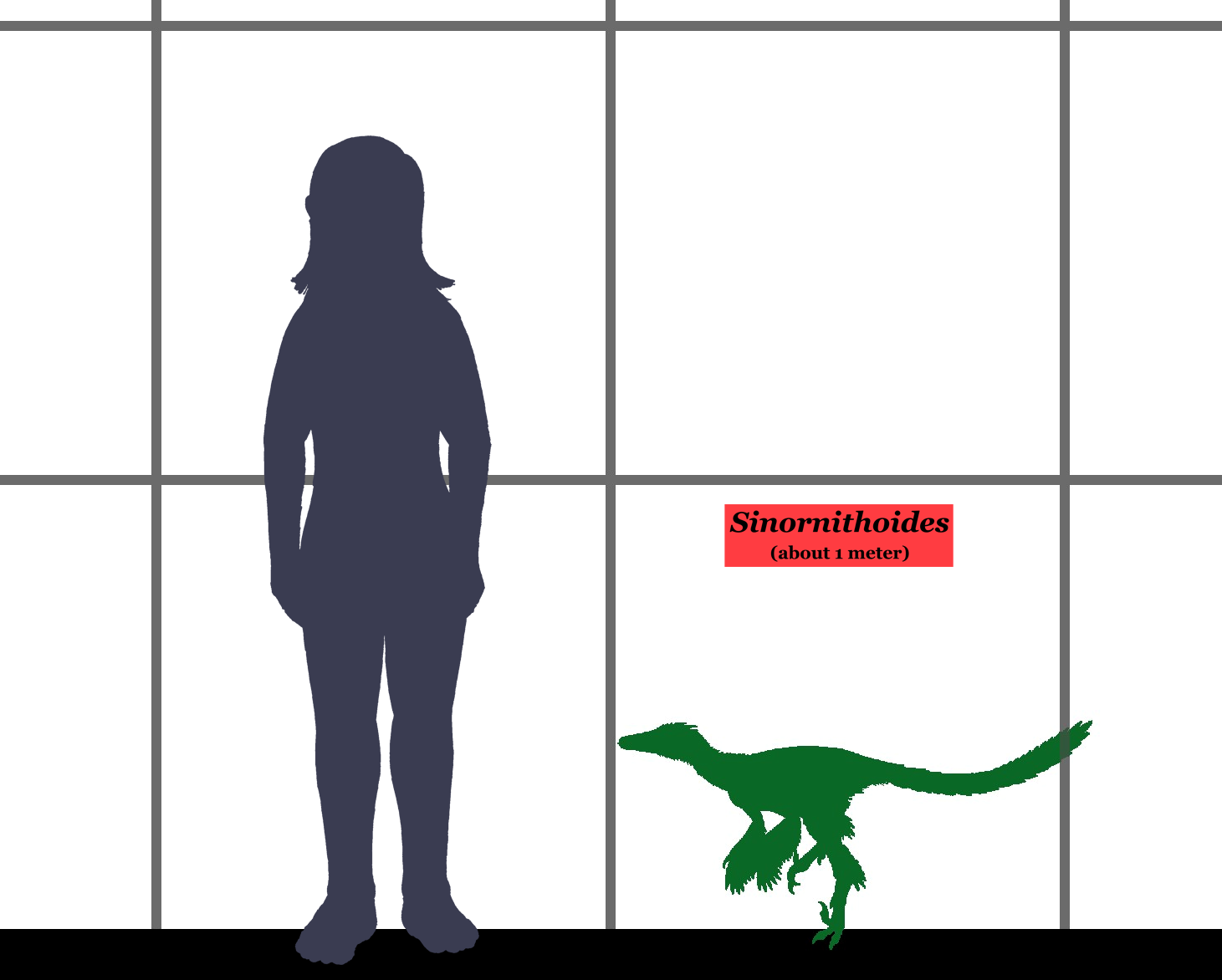
Size of Sinornithoides, compared to a human

Sinornithoides is a troodontid, a group of small, bird-like, gracile maniraptorans. All troodontids have many unique features of the skull, such as closely spaced teeth in the lower jaw, and large numbers of teeth. Troodontids have sickle-claws and raptorial hands, and some of the highest non-avian encephalization quotients, meaning they were behaviourally advanced and had keen senses. In 2010, Gregory S. Paul estimated its body length at 1.1 metres, its weight at 2.5 kilogrammes.

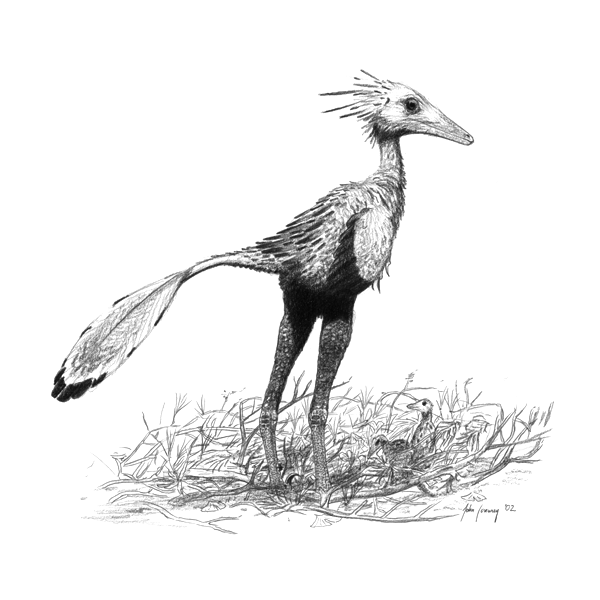
Restoration of a nesting individual

In 1994, Sinornithoides was one of the most completely known troodontids, especially as regarded the palate, but the lack of sufficient fossil material to compare it with induced Russell and Dong not to indicate any diagnostic traits.

The skull of Sinornithoides is elongated and pointed. However, the head is relatively short compared to the body as a whole. The praemaxilla is short. There is a fenestra promaxillaris, a small opening in the front of the maxilla side, which is rare among troodontids. There are four premaxillary and about twenty-three maxillary teeth. The maxillary teeth have no serrations on their front edge; the denticles on the concavely curved rear edge are small. The maxillary teeth are rather recurved. The lacrimal bone lacks a pneumatic channel. In the braincase the subotic recess is large. The tips of the lower jaws do not curve towards each other but touch at their inner sides. The external mandibular fenestra is large. The dentary, lower jaw, teeth are quite pointed and have no front edge denticles; their rear edge is very straight. The holotype preserves a furcula and a basket of fifteen pairs of gastralia. The arms are weakly developed, with a slender humerus and ulna. The front top of the third metatarsal is not fully overgrown by the second and fourth metatarsals. The sickle claw of the second toe is relatively large and long for a troodontid.

== Classification ==
Sinornithoides was in 1994 assigned to the Troodontidae.

A possible position of Sinornithoides in the evolutionary tree of the Paraves is shown by the cladogram below, following a 2012 analysis by Turner, Makovicky and Norell.

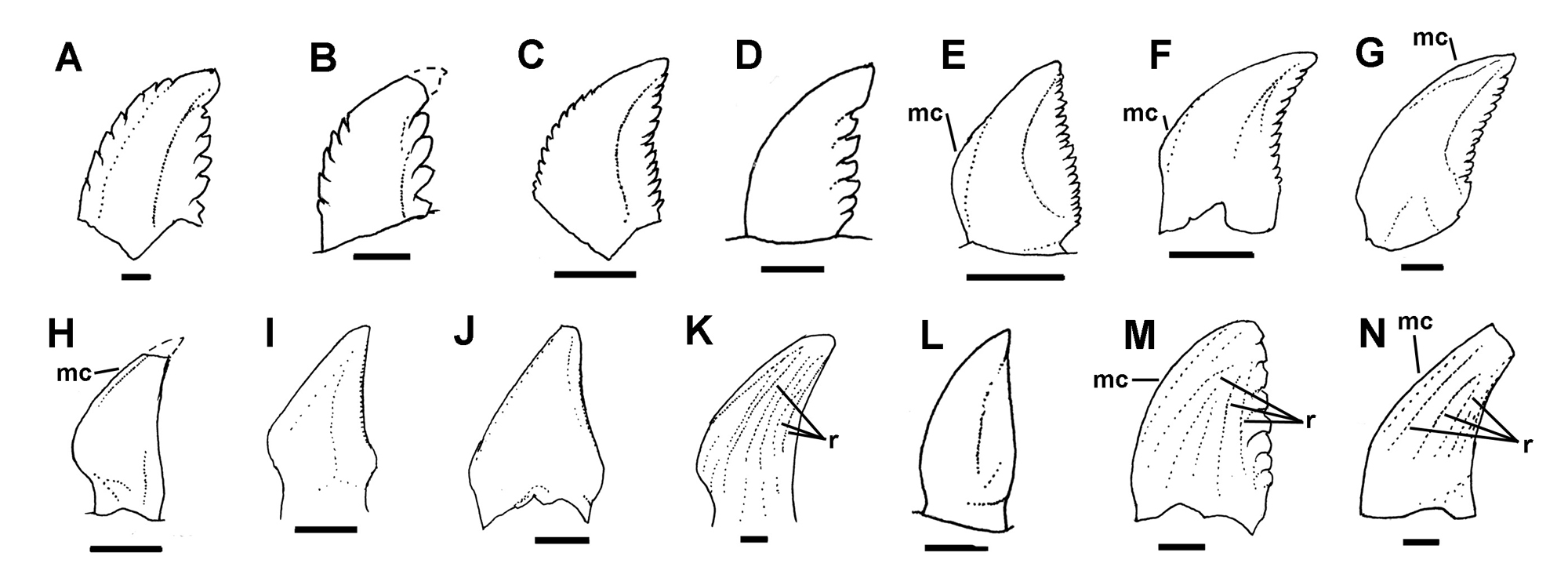
Comparison of troodontid teeth; E and H are Sinornithoides

- Paraves
  - Epidexipteryx
  - - Avialae
    - Deinonychosauria
      - Dromaeosauridae
      - Troodontidae
        - - Anchiornis
          - Xiaotingia
        - - Jinfengopteryginae
            - (Almas)
            - - IGM 100/1126
              - Jinfengopteryx
          - - - Mei
              - - Sinovenator
                - Xixiasaurus
            - - IGM 100/44
              - - Byronosaurus
                - - Sinornithoides
                  - - Troodon
                    - - Saurornithoides
                      - Zanabazar

== See also ==
- Timeline of troodontid research
