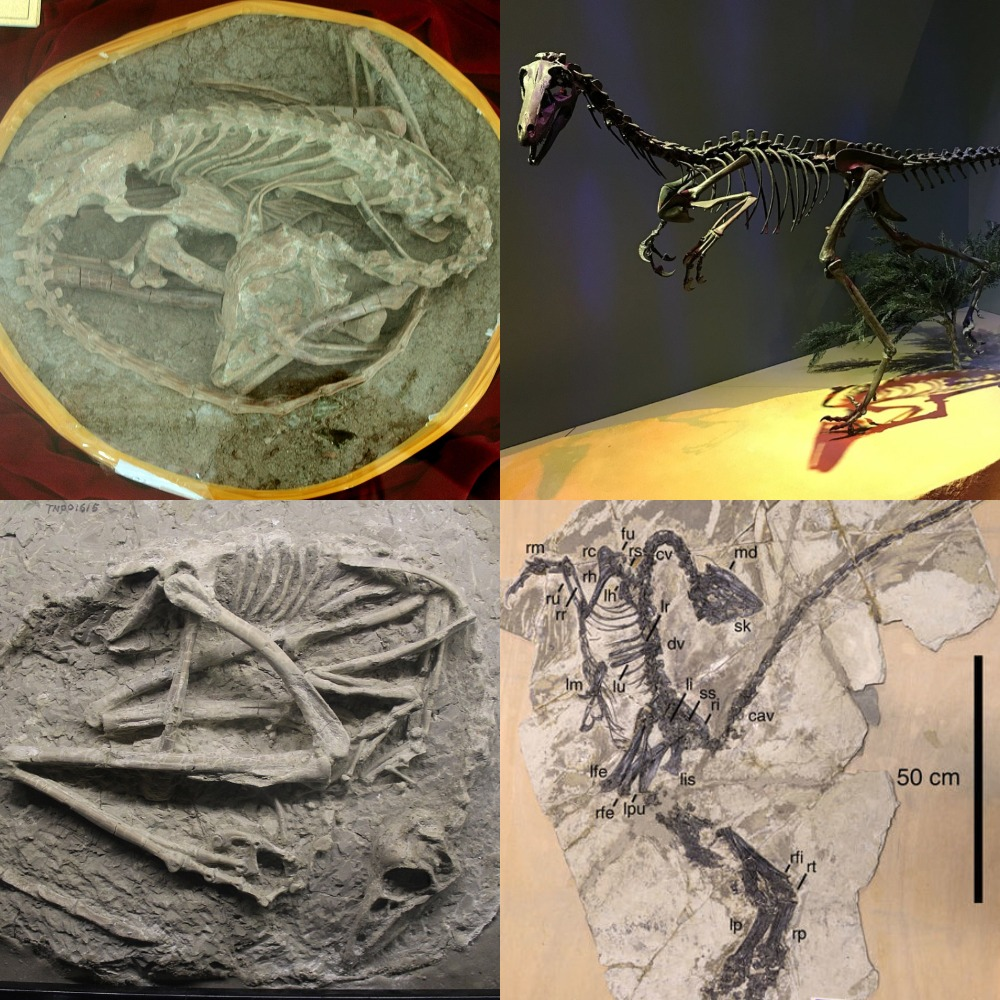
- Collection of four troodontids, clockwise from top left: Mei, unnamed Alaskan troodontid, Jianianhualong, Sinovenator.

Scientific classification
- Kingdom: Animalia
- Phylum: Chordata
- Class: Reptilia
- Clade: Dinosauria
- Clade: Saurischia
- Clade: Theropoda
- Clade: Paraves
- Family: †Troodontidae; Gilmore, 1924

Type species
- †Troodon formosus Leidy, 1856

Clade
- †Albertavenator; †Almas; †Archaeornithoides?; †Daliansaurus; †Harenadraco; †Hesperornithoides; †Jianianhualong; †Jinfengopteryx; †Koparion?; †Liaoningvenator; †Mei; †Papiliovenator; †Paronychodon?; †Polyodontosaurus; †Sinornithoides; †Sinovenator; †Sinusonasus; †Talos; †Tamarro; †Tochisaurus; †Xixiasaurus; †Troodontinae Gilmore, 1924 van der Reest & Currie, 2017; †Borogovia?; †Byronosaurus?; †Dinevenator; †Gobivenator; †Hypnovenator; †Latenivenatrix; †Linhevenator; †Pectinodon; †Philovenator; †Saurornithoides; †Stenonychosaurus; †Troodon; †Urbacodon; †Xenovenator; †Zanabazar

Synonyms
- Saurornithoididae Barsbold, 1974

= Troodontidae =

Troodontids Temporal range: Late Jurassic–Late Cretaceous

Extinct family of bird-like dinosaurs

Troodontidae /troʊ.əˈdɒntɪdiː/ is a clade of bird-like theropod dinosaurs from the Late Jurassic to Late Cretaceous. During most of the 20th century, troodontid fossils were few and incomplete and they have therefore been allied, at various times, with many dinosaurian lineages. More recent fossil discoveries of complete and articulated specimens (including specimens which preserve feathers, eggs, embryos, and complete juveniles), have helped to increase understanding about this group. Anatomical studies, particularly studies of the most primitive troodontids, like Sinovenator, demonstrate striking anatomical similarities with Archaeopteryx and primitive dromaeosaurids, and demonstrate that they are relatives comprising a clade called Paraves.

== Evolution ==
The oldest definitive troodontid known is Hesperornithoides from the Late Jurassic of Wyoming. The slightly older Koparion of Utah is only represented by a single tooth, and small maniraptoran teeth from the Middle Jurassic of England were identified as those of indeterminate troodontids in 2023. Over the Cretaceous, troodontids radiated throughout western North America, Asia, and Europe, suggesting a mostly Laurasian distribution for the group. However, two diagnostic teeth from the latest Cretaceous (Maastrichtian) Kallamedu Formation of southern India were identified as troodontid teeth, suggesting that troodontids either also inhabited Gondwana or managed to disperse to India from elsewhere prior to its separation as an island continent. The potential Gondwanan occurrence of troodontids is supported by the existence of Middle Jurassic remains, which suggest that they originated prior to the breakup of Pangaea. However, due to the lack of other remains from the region, it has been suggested that the existence of Gondwanan troodontids should be regarded as provisional.

== Description ==
Troodontids are a group of small, bird-like, gracile maniraptorans. All troodontids have unique features of the skull, such as large numbers of closely spaced teeth in the lower jaw. Troodontids have sickle-claws and raptorial hands, and some of the highest non-avian encephalization quotients, suggesting that they were behaviourally advanced and had keen senses. They had unusually long legs compared to other theropods, with a large, curved claw on their retractable second toes, similar to the "sickle-claw" of the dromaeosaurids. However, the sickle-claws of troodontids were not as large or recurved as in dromaeosaurids, and in some instances could not be held off the ground and "retracted" to the same degree. In at least one troodontid, Borogovia, the second toe could not be held far off the ground at all and the claw was straight, not curved or sickle-like.

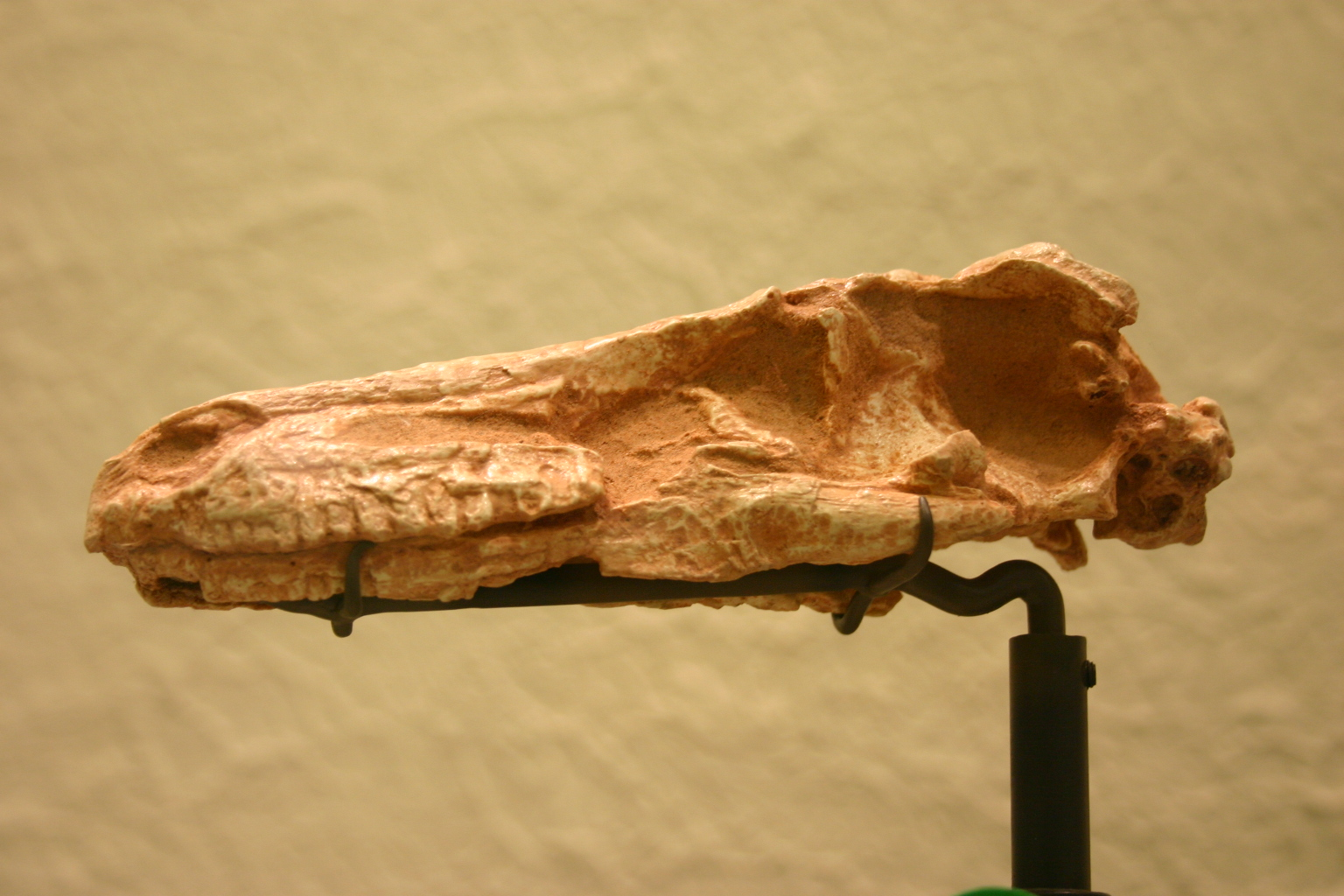
Skull of the troodontid Saurornithoides mongoliensis.

Troodontids had unusually large brains among dinosaurs, comparable to those of living flightless birds. Their eyes were also large, and pointed forward, indicating that they had good binocular vision. The ears of troodontids were also unusual among theropods, having enlarged middle ear cavities, indicating acute hearing ability. The placement of this cavity near the eardrum may have aided in the detection of low-frequency sounds. In some troodontids, ears were also asymmetrical, with one ear placed higher on the skull than the other, a feature shared only with some owls. The specialization of the ears may indicate that troodontids hunted in a manner similar to owls, using their hearing to locate small prey.

=== Diet ===
Although most paleontologists believe that they were predatory carnivores, the many small, coarsely serrated teeth, large denticle size, and U-shaped jaws of some species (particularly Troodon) suggest that some species may have been omnivorous or herbivorous. Some suggest that the large denticle size is reminiscent of the teeth of extant iguanine lizards. In contrast, a few species, such as Byronosaurus, had large numbers of needle-like teeth, which seem best-suited for picking up small prey, such as birds, lizards and small mammals. Other morphological characteristics of the teeth, such as the detailed form of the denticles and the presence of blood grooves, also seem to indicate carnivory. Dental microwear also suggests carnivory, as some troodontids have a "puncture and pull" wear pattern on their teeth. Analyses of barium/calcium and strontium/calcium ratios, which are higher in carnivores due to bioaccumulation, found low ratios in teeth of Stenonychosaurus, suggesting that it had a diet ranging from mixed to plant-dominant omnivory. Though little is known directly about the predatory behavior of troodontids, Fowler and colleagues theorize that the longer legs and smaller sickle claws (as compared to dromaeosaurids) indicate a more cursorial lifestyle, though the study indicates that troodontids were still likely to have used the unguals for prey manipulation. The proportions of the metatarsals, tarsals and unguals of troodontids appear indicative of their having nimbler, but weaker feet, perhaps better adapted for capturing and subduing smaller prey. This suggests an ecological separation from the slower but more powerful Dromaeosauridae.

== Classification ==
Troodontid fossils were among the first dinosaur remains described. Initially, Leidy (1856) assumed they were lacertilian (lizards), but, by 1924, they were referred to Dinosauria by Gilmore, who suggested that they were ornithischians and allied them with the pachycephalosaurian Stegoceras in a Troodontidae. It was not until 1945 that C.M. Sternberg recognized Troodontidae as a theropod family. Since 1969, Troodontidae has typically been allied with Dromaeosauridae, in a clade (natural group) known as Deinonychosauria, but this was by no means a consensus. Holtz (in 1994) erected the clade Bullatosauria, uniting Ornithomimosauria (the "ostrich-dinosaurs") and Troodontidae, on the basis of characteristics including, among others, an inflated braincase (parabasisphenoid) and a long, low opening in the upper jaw (the maxillary fenestra). Features of the pelvis also suggested they were less advanced than dromaeosaurids. New discoveries of primitive troodontids from China (such as Sinovenator and Mei), however, display strong similarities between Troodontidae, Dromaeosauridae and the primitive bird Archaeopteryx, and most paleontologists, including Holtz, now consider troodontids to be much more closely related to birds than they are to ornithomimosaurs, causing the clade Bullatosauria to be abandoned.

One study of theropod systematics by members of the Theropod Working Group has uncovered striking similarities among the most basal dromaeosaurids, troodontids, and Archaeopteryx. This clade is together called Paraves by Novas and Pol. The extensive cladistic analysis conducted by Turner et al., (2012) supported the monophyly of Troodontidae.

=== Taxonomy ===
- Family Troodontidae
  - †Almas
  - †Jianianhualong
  - †Liaoningvenator
  - †Sinornithoides
  - †Talos
  - †Tochisaurus
  - †Xixiasaurus
  - Subfamily Jinfengopteryginae
    - †Jinfengopteryx
    - †Tamarro
    - IGM 100/1128
  - Subfamily Sinovenatorinae
    - †Daliansaurus
    - †Mei
    - †Sinovenator
    - †Sinusonasus
  - Subfamily Troodontinae
    - †Borogovia
    - †Byronosaurus?
    - †Gobivenator
    - †Hypnovenator
    - †Linhevenator
    - †Pectinodon
    - †Philovenator
    - †Urbacodon
    - Tribe Saurornithoidini
      - †Saurornithoides
      - †Zanabazar
    - Tribe Troodontini
      - †Albertavenator
      - †Dinevenator
      - †Latenivenatrix
      - †Stenonychosaurus
      - †Troodon
      - †Xenovenator

=== Phylogeny ===
There are multiple possibilities for the genera included in Troodontidae as well as how they are related. Very primitive species, such as Anchiornis huxleyi, have alternately been found to be early troodontids, early members of the closely related group Avialae, or more primitive paravians by various studies. The cladogram below follows the results of a study by Lefèvre et al. 2017.

- Eumaniraptora
  - Avialae
  - Deinonychosauria
    - Dromaeosauridae
    - Troodontidae
      - - Jinfengopteryx
        - Mei
      - - Sinovenator
        - - Sinusonasus
          - - Sinornithoides
            - - - Byronosaurus
                - Gobivenator
              - - - Troodon
                  - Borogovia
                - Saurornithoides
                - Zanabazar

Shen et al. (2017a) explored troodontid phylogeny using a modified version of the Tsuihiji et al. (2014) analysis. It was in turn based on data published by Gao et al. (2012), a slightly modified version of the Xu et al. (2011) analysis, focusing on advanced troodontids. A simplified version is shown below.

- Deinonychosauria
  - Dromaeosauridae
  - Troodontidae
    - Sinovenator
    - - - - Eosinopteryx
          - Liaoningvenator
        - - Anchiornis
          - Xiaotingia
      - - Talos
        - - Mei
          - - Byronosaurus
            - - IGM 100/140
              - SPS 100/44
              - Sinornithoides
              - - Gobivenator
                - - Linhevenator
                  - Philovenator
                - - Troodon
                  - - Saurornithoides
                    - Zanabazar

In 2014, Brusatte, Lloyd, Wang and Norell published an analysis on Coelurosauria, based on data from Turner et al. (2012) who named a third subfamily of troodontids, Jinfengopteryginae. Their analysis included more basal troodontid species but failed to resolve many of their interrelationships, resulting in large "polytomies" (sets of species where the branching order in the family tree is uncertain). An updated version of the Brusatte et al. analysis was provided by Shen et at. (2017b), who included more taxa and recovered greater resolution. Shen et at. named a fourth subfamily of troodontids, the Sinovenatorinae. A simplified version of their analysis is shown below.

- Deinonychosauria
  - Dromaeosauridae
  - Troodontidae
    - - Eosinopteryx
      - Anchiornis
      - - Aurornis
        - Xiaotingia
    - - IGM 100/44
      - Byronosaurus
      - Xixiasaurus
      - Jinfengopteryginae
        - IGM 100/1323 (Almas)
        - - IGM 100/1128
          - Jinfengopteryx
      - Sinovenatorinae
        - Mei
        - - Sinovenator
          - - Daliansaurus
            - Sinusonasus
      - - Sinornithoides
        - - Troodon
          - - Zanabazar
            - Saurornithoides

Troodontinae is a subfamily of troodontid dinosaurs. The subfamily was first used in 2017 for the group of troodontids descended from the last common ancestor of Gobivenator mongoliensis and Zanabazar junior, but has been redefined to be the least inclusive clade containing Saurornithoides mongoliensis and Troodon formosus, utilizing the type species of the clade. Below is a cladogram of the Troodontinae as published by Aaron van der Reest and Phil Currie, in 2017.

- Troodontidae
  - Sinovenator
  - - Anchiornis
    - - Mei
      - Talos
      - - Byronosaurus
        - - MPC-D 100/44
          - Sinornithoides
          - Troodontinae
            - - Urbacodon
              - Gobivenator
            - - - Latenivenatrix
                - - Philovenator
                  - Linhevenator
              - - Two Medicine troodontid
                - - Saurornithoides
                  - Zanabazar

== Paleobiology ==
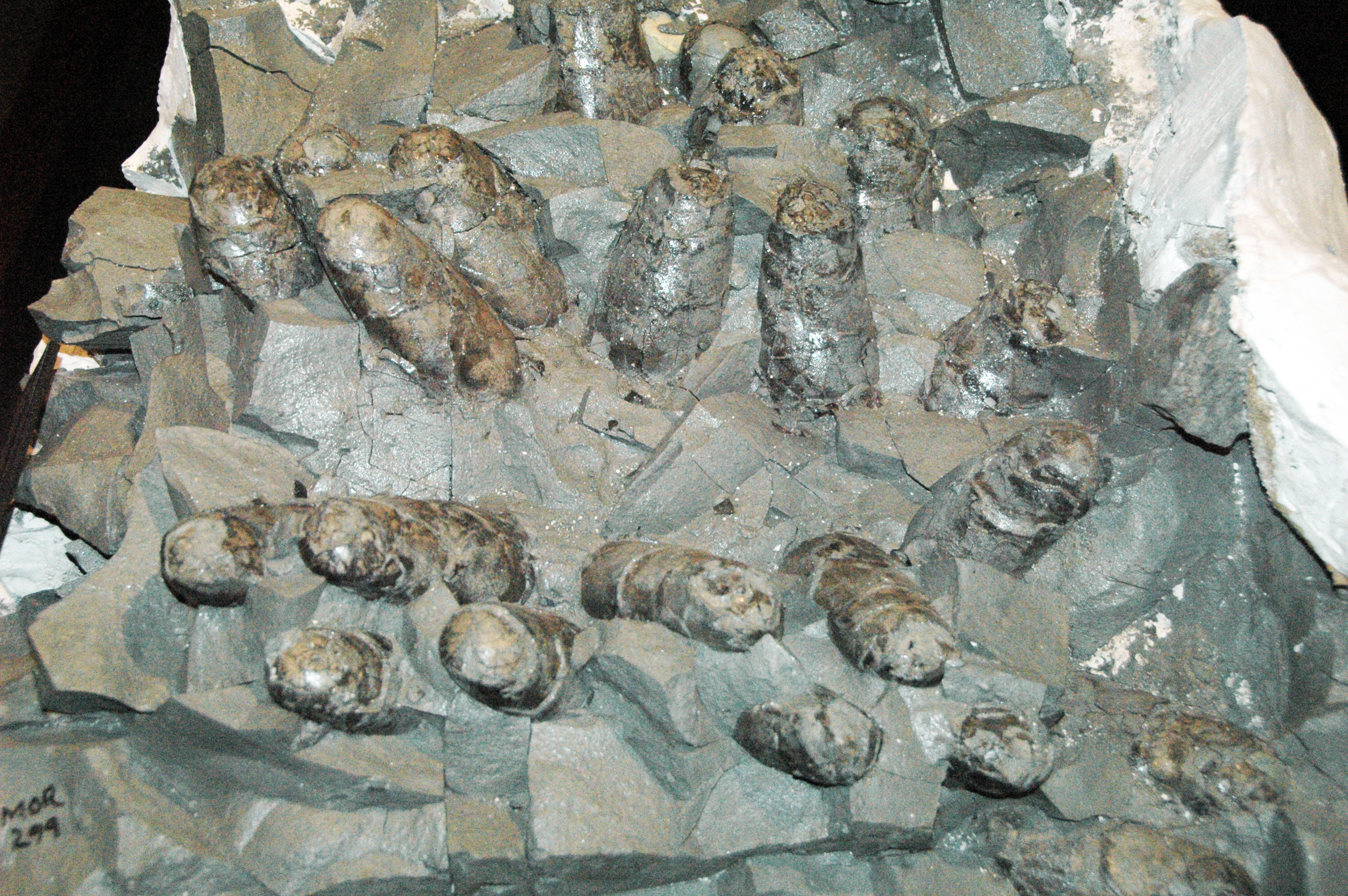
Prismatoolithus levis eggs, which are considered to have been laid by a troodontid

Many troodontid nests, including eggs that contain fossilized embryos, have been described. Hypotheses about troodontid reproduction have been developed from this evidence (see Troodon). A few troodont fossils, including specimens of Mei and Sinornithoides, demonstrate that these animals roosted like birds, with their heads tucked under their forelimbs. These fossils, as well as numerous skeletal similarities to birds and related feathered dinosaurs, support the idea that troodontids probably bore a bird-like feathered coat. The discovery of fully feathered, primitive troodontids, such as Jianianhualong, lend support to this.

In 2004, Mark Norell and colleagues described two partial troodontid skulls (specimen numbers IGM 100/972 and IGM 100/974) found in a nest of oviraptorid eggs in the Djadokhta Formation of Mongolia. The nest is quite certainly that of an oviraptorosaur, since an oviraptorid embryo is still preserved inside one of the eggs. The two partial troodontid skulls were first described by Norell et al. (1994) as dromaeosaurids, but reassigned to the troodontid Byronosaurus after further study. The troodontids were either hatchlings or embryos, and fragments of eggshell are adhered to them although it seems to be oviraptorid eggshell. The presence of tiny troodontids in an oviraptorid nest is an enigma. Hypotheses explaining how they came to be there include that they were the prey of the adult oviraptorid, that they were there to prey on oviraptorid hatchlings, or that some troodontids may have been nest parasites.

=== Feeding ===
Troodontid feeding was discovered to be typical of coelurosaurian theropods, with a characteristic "puncture and pull" feeding method seen also in such theropods as the dromaeosauridae and tyrannosauridae. Studies of wear patterns on the teeth of dromaeosaurids by Angelica Torices et al. indicate that dromaeosaurid teeth share similar wear patterns to those seen in the aforementioned groups. However, micro wear on the teeth indicated that dromaeosaurids likely preferred larger prey items than the troodontids with which they often shared their environment. Such differences in dietary preferences likely allowed them to inhabit the same ecosystems. The same study also indicated that dromaeosaurids such as Dromaeosaurus and Saurornitholestes (two dromaeosaurids analyzed in the study) likely included bone in their diet and were better adapted to handle struggling prey, while troodontids, equipped with weaker jaws, preyed on softer-bodied animals and prey items such as invertebrates and carrion that either were immobile or could likely be swallowed whole. Ba/Ca and Sr/Ca ratios found in the enamel of Oldman Formation troodontids indicate that they were mixed-feeding to plant-dominant omnivores.

=== Flight ===
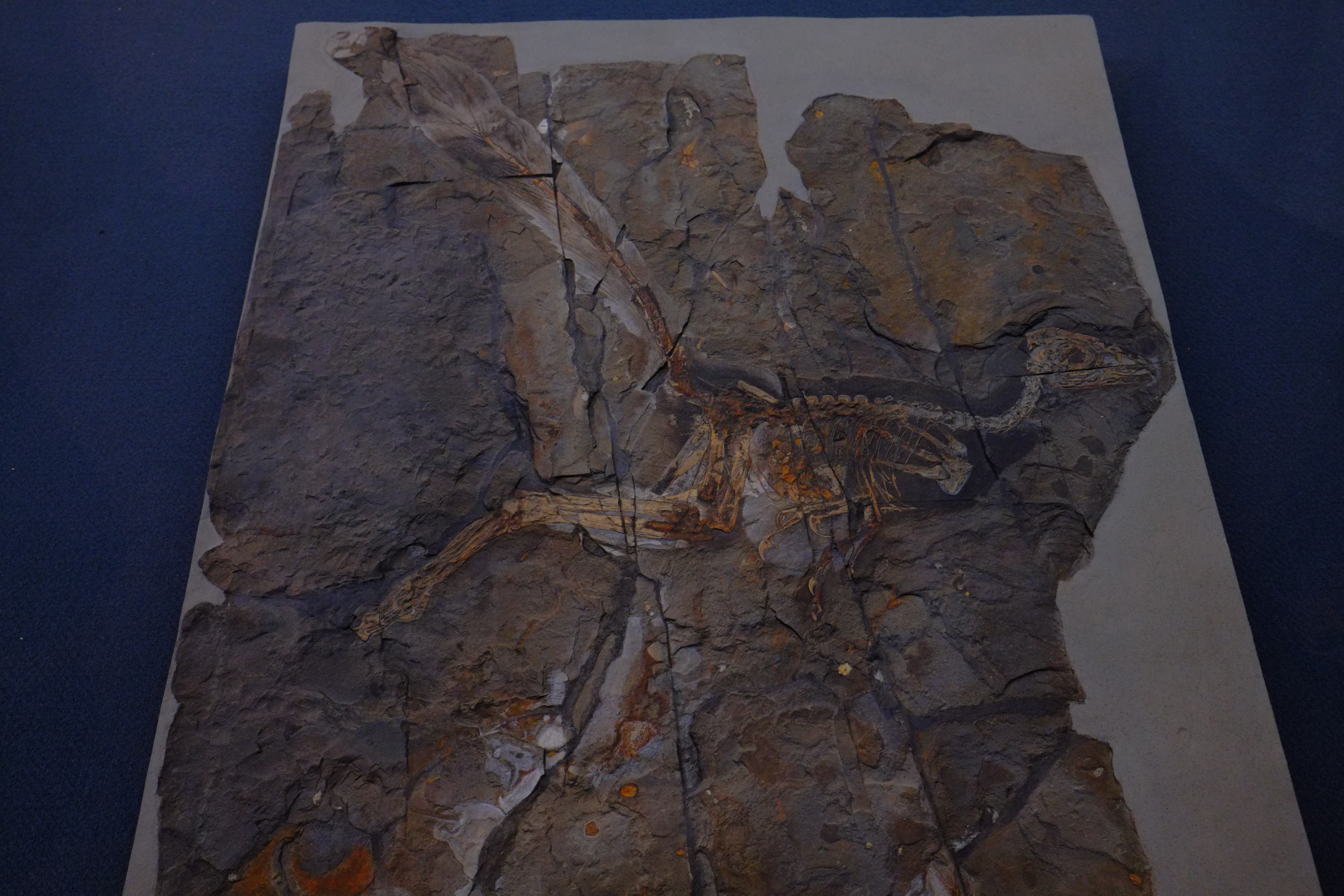
Holotype specimen of Jinfengopteryx featuring elongated feathers

Compared to most other paravians, troodontids are unspecialised for aerial locomotion. However, Jinfengopteryx ranks closely with non-avian theropods known to engage in powered flight like Microraptor and Rahonavis.

==== Bird evolution ====
Troodontids are important in research into the origin of birds because they share many anatomical characters with early birds. Crucially, the substantially complete Hesperornithoides ("Lori") is a troodontid from the Late Jurassic Morrison Formation, close to the time of Archaeopteryx. The discovery of Jurassic troodonts is positive physical evidence that derived deinonychosaurs were present before the time that avians arose. This fact strongly invalidates the "temporal paradox" cited by the few remaining opponents of the idea that birds are closely related to dinosaurs.

=== Palaeopathology ===
A variety of palaeopathologies have been diagnosed in troodontid metatarsals from Alberta. These include a superficial cortical fracture that caused a chronic stable callus and a minor avulsion or chip fracture arising from stress at the posterolateral insertion site of the gastrocnemius. A third specimen revealed a pathology that impacted the foot more broadly, resulting in chronic callus formation throughout the shaft, in addition to chronic inflammation at the distal joint of the fourth metatarsal and the deformation of the second metatarsal.

== See also ==
- Timeline of troodontid research
- Evolution of birds
