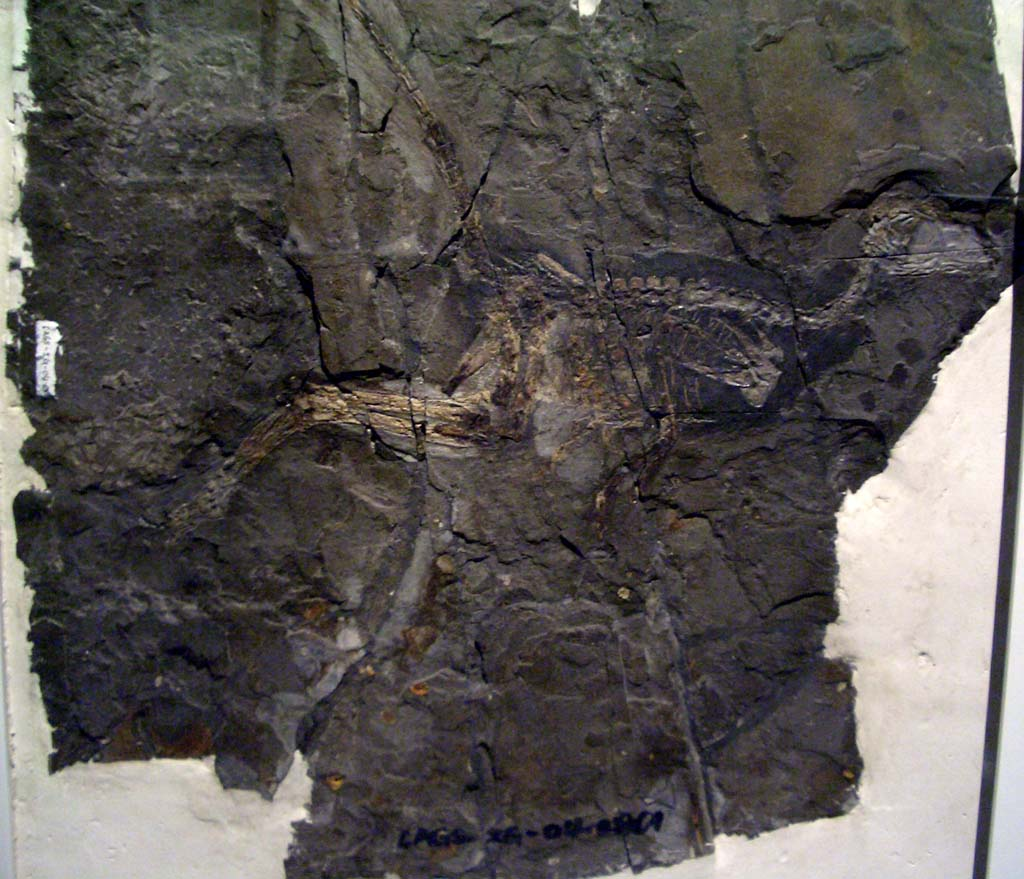
- J. elegans fossil specimen

Scientific classification
- Kingdom: Animalia
- Phylum: Chordata
- Class: Reptilia
- Clade: Dinosauria
- Clade: Saurischia
- Clade: Theropoda
- Family: †Troodontidae
- Subfamily: †Jinfengopteryginae
- Genus: †Jinfengopteryx; Ji et al., 2005

Type species
- †Jinfengopteryx elegans Ji et al., 2005

= Jinfengopteryx =

Jinfengopteryx Temporal range: Early Cretaceous, 122 Ma

Theropod dinosaur genus

Jinfengopteryx (from Jinfeng, 'golden phoenix', the queen of birds in Chinese folklore, and Ancient Greek: πτερυξ pteryx, meaning 'feather') is a genus of maniraptoran dinosaur. It was found in the Qiaotou Member of the Huajiying Formation of Hebei Province, China, and is therefore of uncertain age. The Qiaotou Member may correlate with the more well-known Early Cretaceous Yixian Formation, and so probably dates to around 122 Ma (122 million years) ago.

== Description ==
Size compared with a human

Jinfengopteryx is known from one specimen (number CAGS-IG-04-0801), a nearly complete articulated skeleton, which measured 55 cm (1.8 ft) long. It was preserved with extensive impressions of pennaceous feathers, but it lacks flight feathers on its hind legs, which are present in related dinosaurs such as Pedopenna or Anchiornis. It also preserves several small, oval structures that are reddish-yellow in color, possibly seeds that the dinosaur had eaten before it died; they may also be small eggs or developing follicles. If the oval structures are indeed seeds, they could indicate that Jinfengopteryx was an omnivore.

=== Feathers ===
Jinfengopteryx preserves feather impressions "around the neck, the body, the hips, the upper hindlimbs, the tail, and near the manus" (end of the front limbs). The specimen shows short, simple feathers on its neck, body, hips, and upper legs. Also preserved are long, vaned tail feathers that become increasingly longer distally (away from the body).

=== Flight ===
A 2020 study on paravian flight capacities demonstrates that Jinfengopteryx matches closely with other flying non-avian theropods like Microraptor and Rahonavis.

== Classification ==
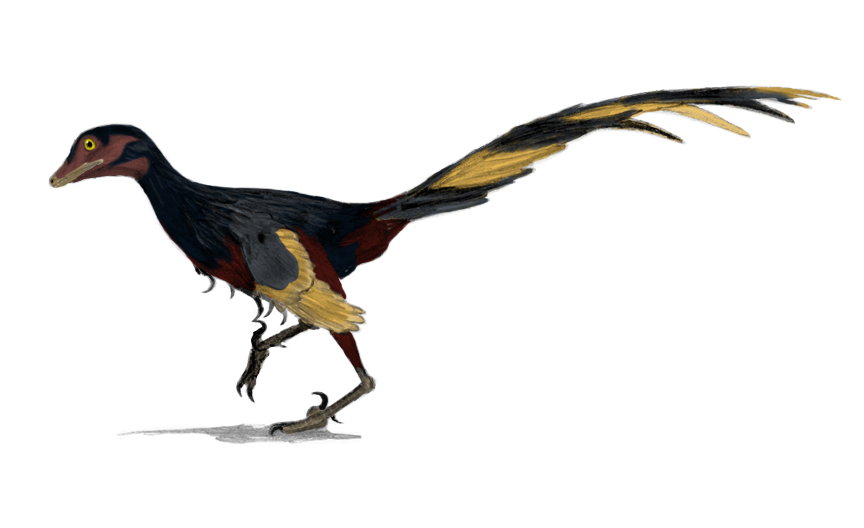
Artist's life restoration

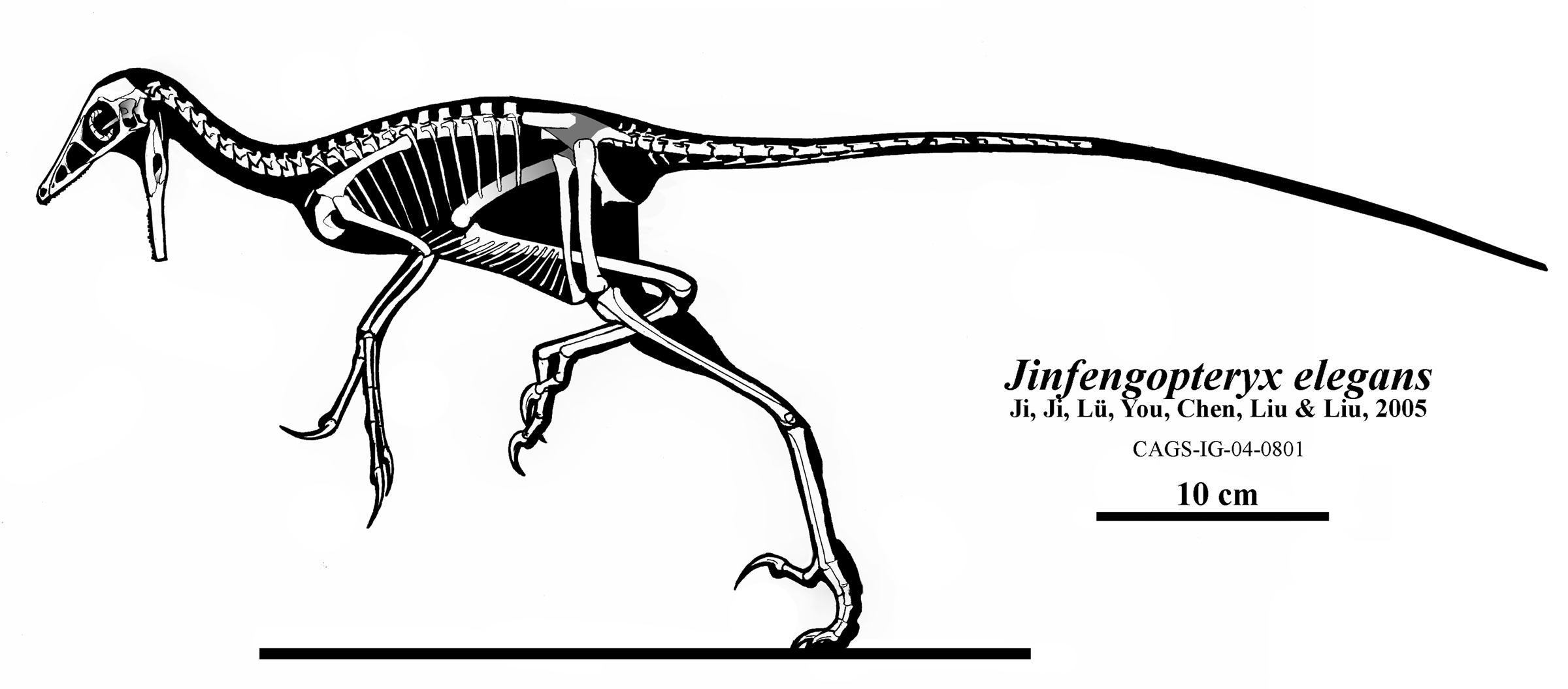
Skeletal reconstruction

The authors of the original description considered Jinfengopteryx to be the most basal avialan (bird), and a member of the family Archaeopterygidae. In a 2007 follow-up paper, they went on to compare Jinfengopteryx and Archaeopteryx, still supporting its placement as an archaeopterygid, but providing no phylogenetic analysis. However, Luis Chiappe pointed out that Jinfengopteryx appears to have more in common with the troodontids, such as an enlarged claw on its short second toe, and that numerous scientists suspect it may belong to that group. In 2006, Xu and Norell also suggested that Jinfengopteryx was a troodontid, based on general body plan and features of the teeth. In a 2007 analysis of the relationships between troodontids, dromaeosaurids, and early birds, Turner and colleagues did find Jinfengopteryx to be a troodontid, and referred it to that group, noting that it is the first troodontid specimen to preserve evidence of feathers. In 2012, Turner and colleagues erected a new subfamily called Jinfengopteryginae. The unique features of that subfamily include the large antorbital fenestrae and the bifurcated jugal. The specimen IGM 100/1126 (currently without an assigned genus) is the closest relative of Jinfengopteryx within the group.

- Oviraptorosauria
- Paraves
  - †Scansoriopterygidae
  - - †Eosinopteryx
    - Eumaniraptora
      - †Jinfengopteryx
      - †Aurornis
      - †Dromaeosauridae
      - †Troodontidae
      - Avialae
        - †Anchiornis
        - - †Archaeopteryx
          - True birds and other avialans

Cladogram following the results of a phylogenetic study by Cau et al., 2015.

== See also ==
- Timeline of troodontid research
