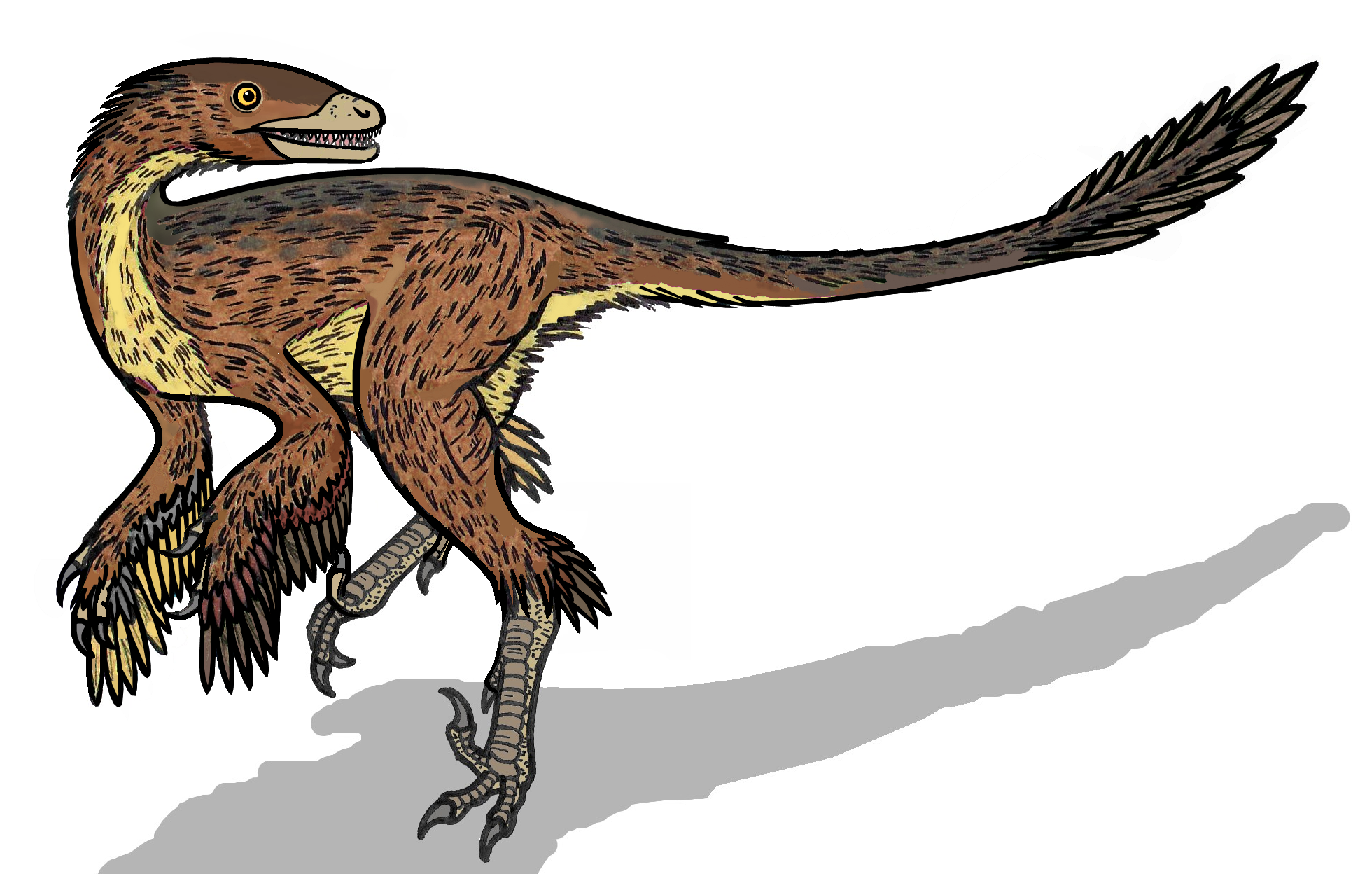
- Life restoration

Scientific classification
- Domain: Eukaryota
- Kingdom: Animalia
- Phylum: Chordata
- Clade: Dinosauria
- Clade: Saurischia
- Clade: Theropoda
- Clade: Paraves
- Family: †Troodontidae
- Subfamily: †Sinovenatorinae
- Genus: †Sinusonasus; Xu & Wang, 2004

Type species
- †Sinusonasus magnodens Xu & Wang, 2004

Synonyms
- Sinucerasaurus Xu & Norell, 2006

= Sinusonasus =

Sinusonasus Temporal range: Early Cretaceous, 125 Ma

Extinct genus of dinosaurs

Sinusonasus is a genus of dinosaurs from the Early Cretaceous Period, recovered from the Yixian Formation. It lived in what is now the Liaoning Province of China. Sinusonasus was a theropod, specifically a troodontid dinosaur.

The type species, Sinusonasus magnodens, was named and described by Xu Xing and Wang Xiaolin in 2004. The generic name, derived from Latin sinus, "wave", and nasus, "nose", refers to the sinusoid form, in lateral view, of the nasals. The specific name means "big-toothed" from Latin magnus, "large" and dens, "tooth". In a later publication the species is referred to as "Sinucerasaurus" but this is a junior objective synonym.

The holotype, IVPP V 11527, was found in the Lujiatun Member of the Yixian Formation, dating from the Hauterivian. It consists of a partial skeleton including skull and lower jaw fragments and partial tail, pelvis and hindlimbs. The fossil is compressed and partially articulated.

Sinusonasus is a small troodontid. In 2010, Gregory S. Paul estimated its length at one metre, its weight at 2.5 kilogrammes. The femur is 141 millimetres long.

In 2004, several distinguishing traits were established. An interantorbital channel, connecting the antorbital fenestrae at each skull side, is lacking. The nasal bone has an undulating profile. The middle maxillary teeth are rather large. The chevrons on the rear caudal vertebrae are so long, measured from the front to the back, that they connect, forming a continuous plate at the underside of the tail. The neck of the thighbone is elongated.

More generally, the head is relatively short, equalling 77% of the length of the thighbone. There are at least nineteen maxillary teeth per side. The front teeth are not serrated: those more to the rear only have denticles at the trailing edge. Five sacral vertebrae are present; the tail probably consisted of about thirty vertebrae. The pubic bone probably pointed obliquely to the front. The ischium is elongated. Sinusonasus has a long lower leg, indicating a good running capacity. The foot is "arctometatarsal", with a 'pinched' upper third metatarsal. The second metatarsal is distinctly shorter than the fourth. The second toe bears a retractable 'sickle claw'.

Sinusonasus was in 2004 placed in the Troodontidae. It was presumed to have had a rather derived position, despite living in the Early Cretaceous. This was by the describing authors not interpreted as an indication for a long ghost lineage, troodontids developing earlier during the Jurassic than had been thought, but explained by rapid evolutionary change after a Cretaceous origin of the group.

== See also ==
- Timeline of troodontid research
