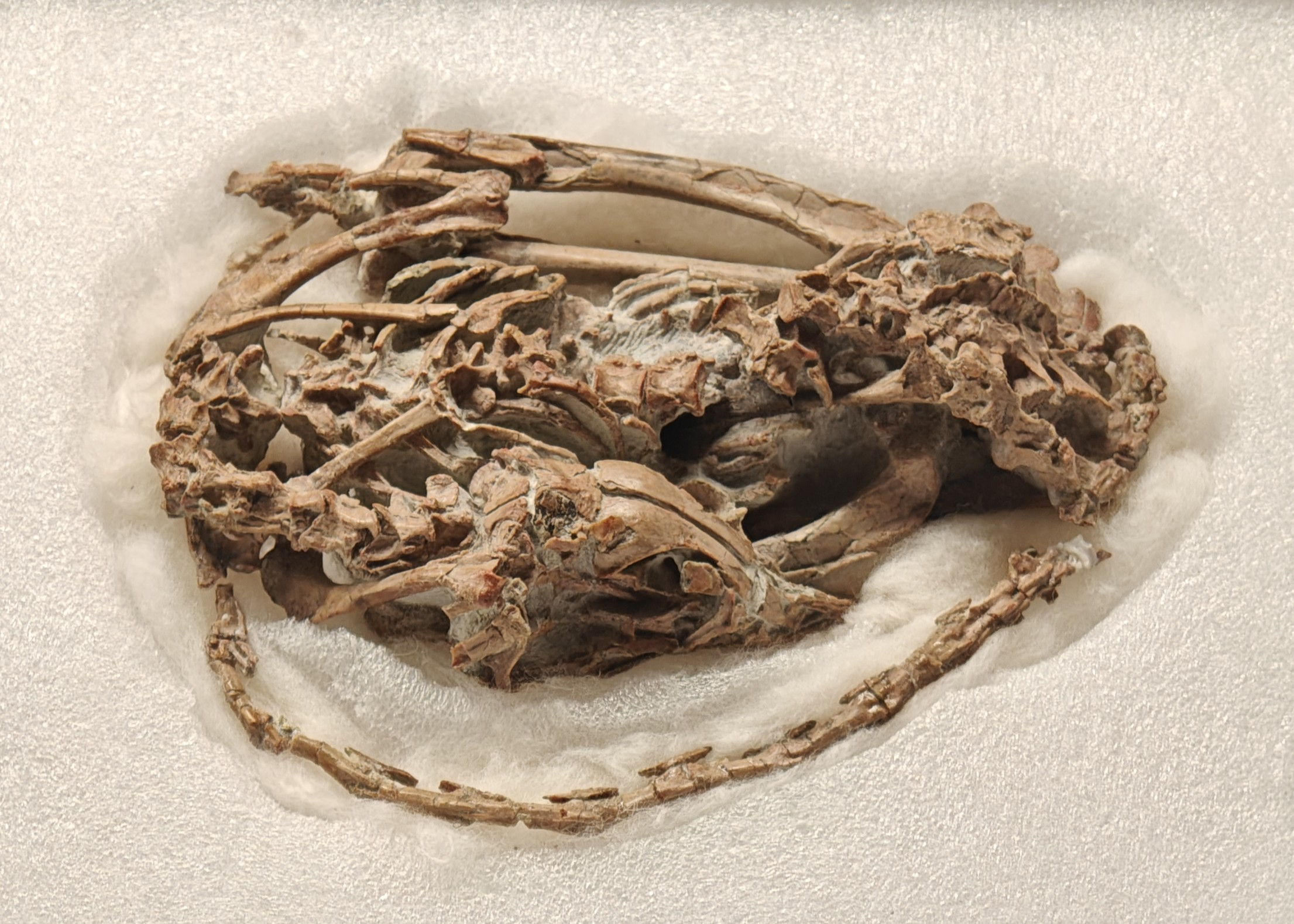
- Holotype specimen (IVPP V12733)

Scientific classification
- Kingdom: Animalia
- Phylum: Chordata
- Class: Reptilia
- Clade: Dinosauria
- Clade: Saurischia
- Clade: Theropoda
- Family: †Troodontidae
- Subfamily: †Sinovenatorinae
- Genus: †Mei; Xu & Norell, 2004
- Species: †M. long

Binomial name
- †Mei long Xu & Norell, 2004

= Mei long =

Mei long Temporal range: Early Cretaceous, 125 Ma

Extinct species of dinosaur

Mei (from Chinese: 寐; pinyin: mèi; lit. 'sleepy') is a genus of duck-sized troodontid dinosaur first unearthed by paleontologists from the Yixian Formation in Liaoning, China in 2004. Mei lived during the Early Cretaceous period. The binomial name of its only species, Mei long (Chinese 寐 mèi and 龍 lóng), means sleeping dragon.

== Description ==
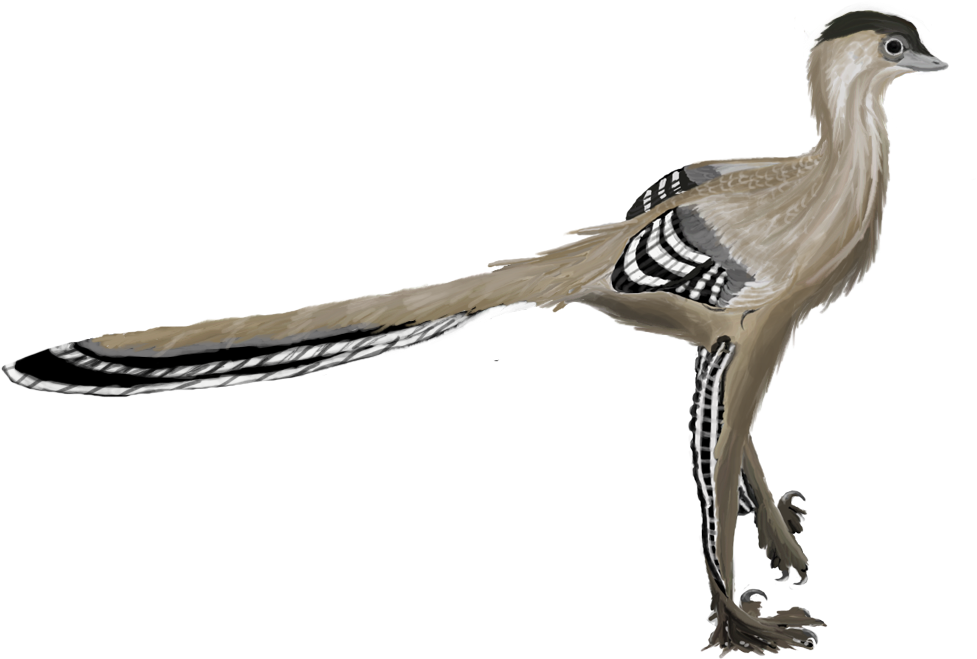
Life restoration of the juvenile type specimen

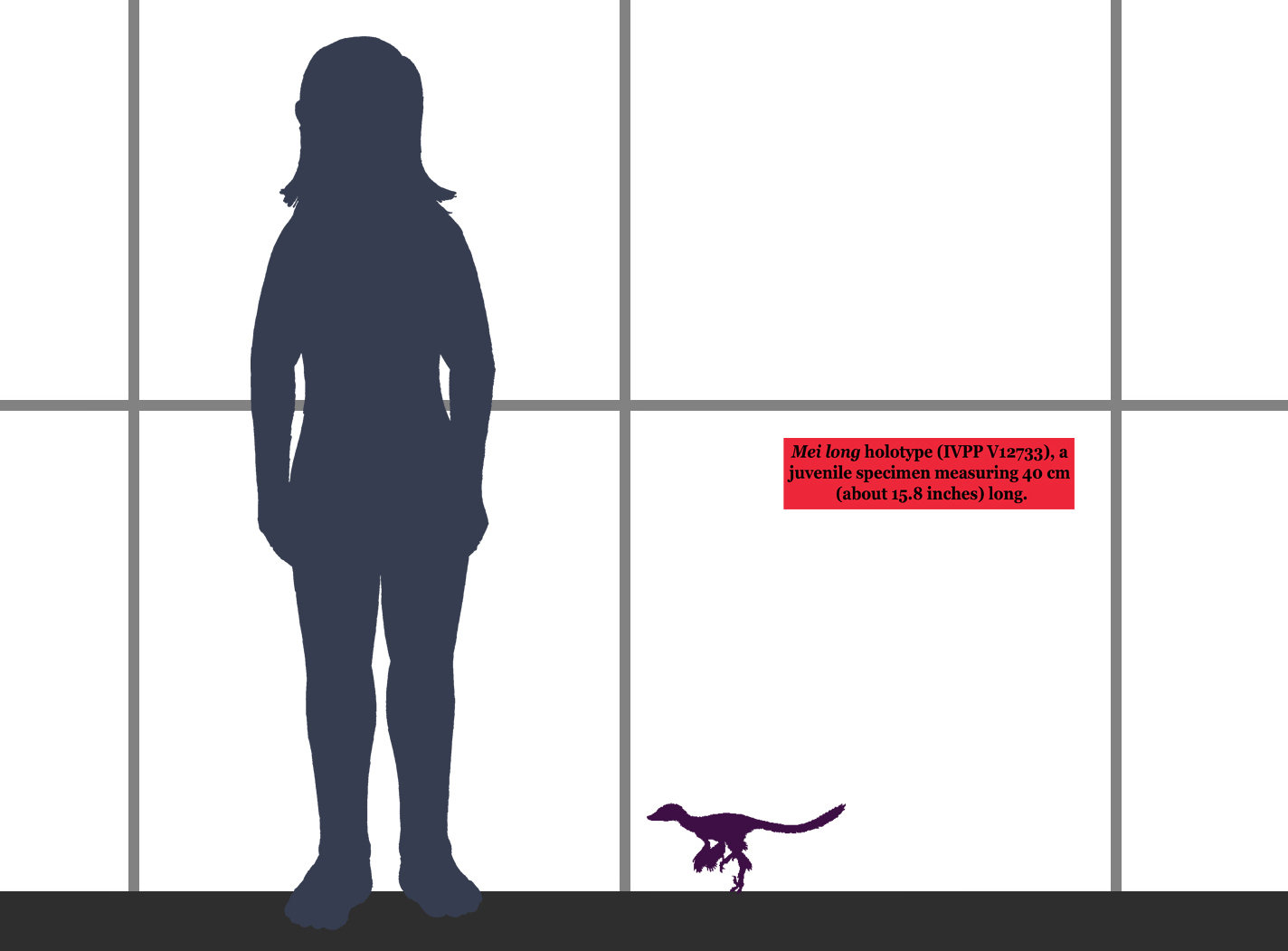
Size of the holotype, compared to a human.

Mei is a troodontid, a group of small, bird-like, gracile maniraptorans. All troodontids have many unique features of the skull, such as closely spaced teeth in the lower jaw, and large numbers of teeth. Troodontids have sickle-claws and raptorial hands, and some of the highest non-avian encephalization quotients, meaning they were behaviourally advanced and had keen senses.

The type fossil is a young juvenile about 53 centimetres (21 in) long, complete and exceptionally well preserved in three-dimensional detail, with the snout nestled beneath one of the forelimbs and the legs neatly folded beneath the body, similar to the roosting position of modern birds. This posture provides another behavioral link between birds and other dinosaurs. The chemistry of the matrix stone and the resting pose indicate the living animal was probably buried instantly in volcanic ash. A second specimen, DNHM D2154, was also preserved in a sleeping posture. Although DNHM D2154 exhibits several juvenile-like features including free cervical ribs, unfused frontals and nasals, and a short snouted skull, other attributes, full fusion of all neurocentral synostoses and the sacrum, and dense exteriors to cortical bone, suggest a small, mature individual. Microscopic examination of tibia and fibula histology confirms maturity and suggests an individual greater than two years old with slowed growth. Mei is notable as a distinct species of troodontid based on several unique features, including extremely large nares. It is most closely related to the troodontid Sinovenator, which places it near the base of the troodontid (bird like) family.

As a basal troodontid, unlike advanced troodontids, it has a bird like hip structure shared with many advanced maniraptorans.

== Palaeoecology ==
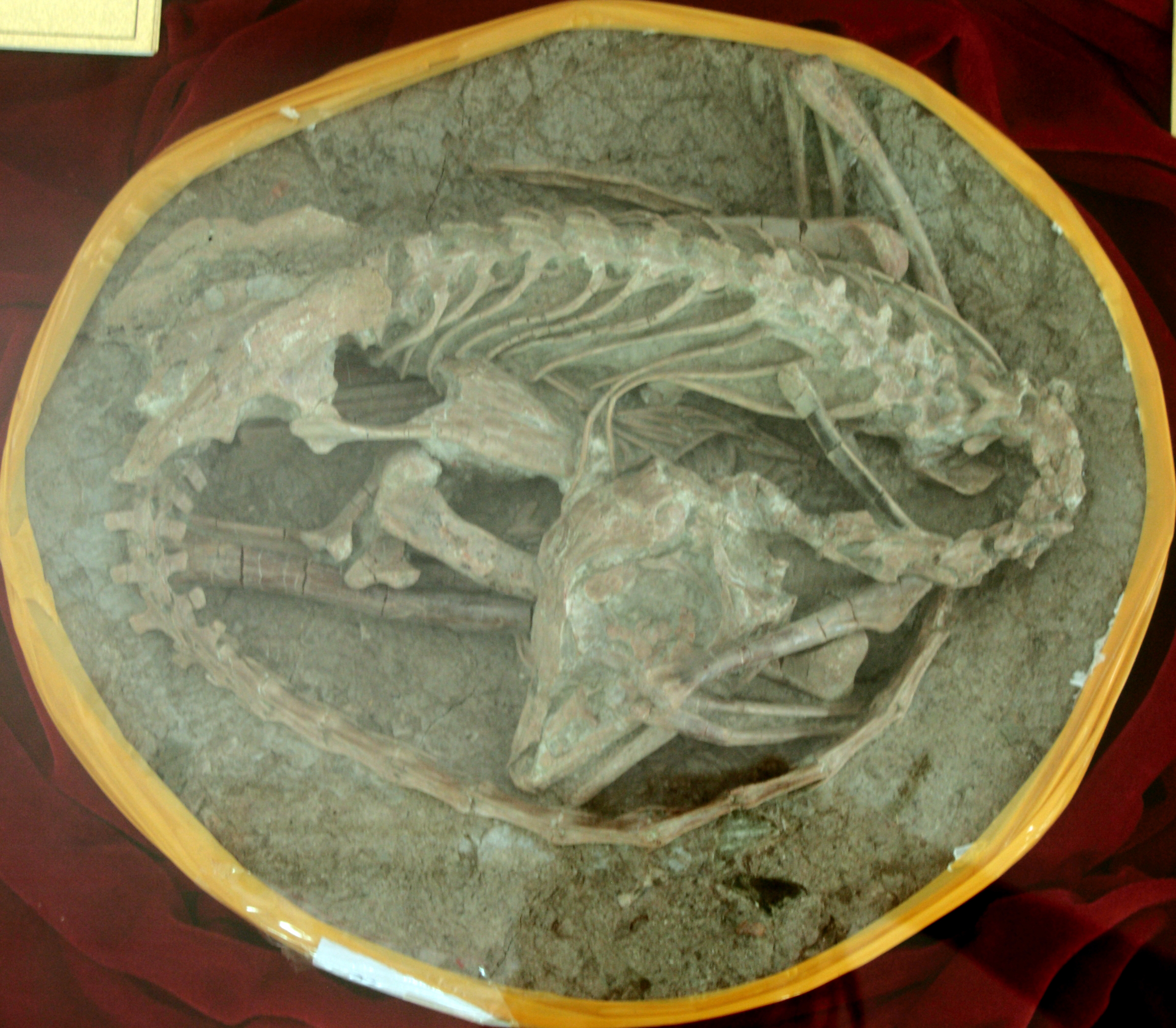
Fossil specimen

Mei lived in the Early Aptian stage of the Cretaceous period, about 125.8 million years ago. At this time, the Liaoning area was dominated by numerous volcanoes in a landscape that was covered in coniferous forest, with an understory of ferns and other plants like large horsetails. Several other trees were present, such as ginkgos and araucarias. Some of the earliest flowering plants were also found here. Rivers and streams coming down from the flanks of the volcanoes fed into lakes in the valleys.

There were many species of small birdlike theropod dinosaurs living in the area, although most of them were slightly larger than Mei. This probably led to a lot of niche partitioning. There were only five or six species of herbivorous non-theropod dinosaurs, however, and a large and varied fauna of early mammals and pterosaurs. The apex predator was the 9-meter-long tyrannosauroid Yutyrannus, which would have preyed on the two or more species of sauropod. Often, volcanoes erupted, entombing animals in ash and suffocating others with carbon monoxide, which accounts for the high level of preservation of fossils.

Mei probably fed on small lizards and insects on the forest floor. It probably climbed trees as well to shelter from larger predators, and was probably not omnivorous. Judging by the length of the legs, it was a fast runner. Nothing is known about its nesting habits.

When the first fossil of Mei was discovered, scientists were charmed to see the fossil in a birdlike sleeping posture. Mei long means 'sleeping dragon' in Chinese. The animal had probably died from carbon monoxide poisoning, then became entombed in ash.

== See also ==
- Timeline of troodontid research
- Changmiania
- The dictionary definition of 寐 at Wiktionary
