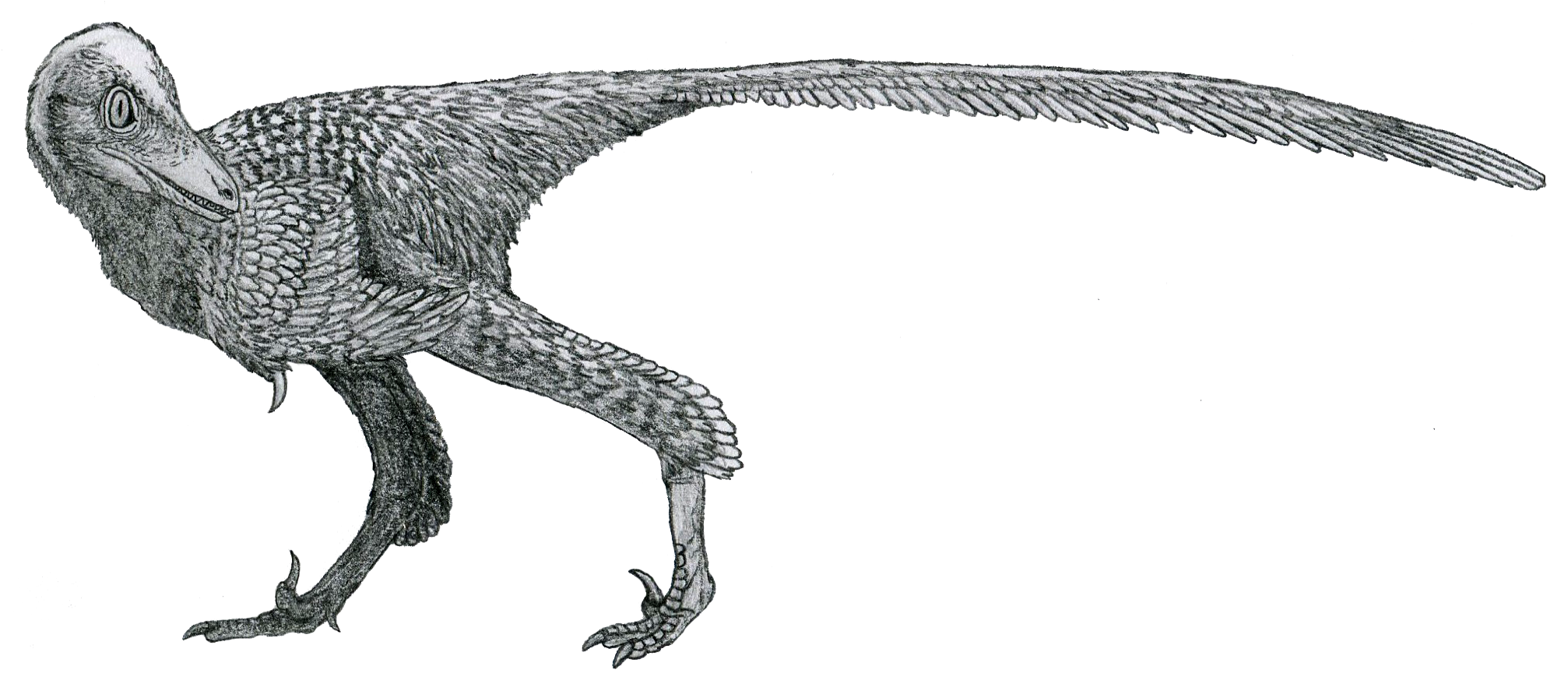
- Life reconstruction of Almas, Tom Parker, 2017.

Scientific classification
- Kingdom: Animalia
- Phylum: Chordata
- Class: Reptilia
- Clade: Dinosauria
- Clade: Saurischia
- Clade: Theropoda
- Family: †Troodontidae
- Genus: †Almas; Pei et al., 2017

Type species
- †Almas ukhaa Pei et al., 2017

= Almas ukhaa =

Almas Temporal range: Campanian, 75–71 Ma

Genus of reptiles (fossil)

Almas is a genus of troodontid theropod dinosaur from the Late Cretaceous of Mongolia. It contains a single species, Almas ukhaa, named in 2017 by Pei Rui and colleagues, based on a partial articulated skeleton. The only known specimen was found in the Djadochta Formation, which is late Campanian in age.

== Habitat ==
Almas ukhaa is known exclusively for the Gobi Desert, in present-day southern Mongolia. During the Upper Cretaceous, this region was characterised by arid or semi-arid environments, with sandy dunes, seasonal alluvial plains and scattered vegetation. Almas ukhaa shared his environment with numerous dinosaurs from the fauna of the Djadochta Formation.

== Lifestyle and behaviour ==
The anatomical characteristics of Almas ukhaa suggest an active and dynamic lifestyle. The slender hind limbs indicate rapid locomotion, useful for both hunting and evasion of predators. The high ratio of brain volume and body mass typical of troodontids suggests developed sensory abilities, including good coordination and potentially complex behaviours. It was probably solitary, and active during twilight or at night because of the relatively large orbits.

== Diet ==
Although there is no gastric content directly attributed to Almas ukhaa, the teeth and morphology of the skull, combined with the relationship with other well-known troodontids, indicate an opportunistic diet that is probably omnivorous or faunivorous.It is likely that it fed on: small vertebrates (lizards, primitive mammals), insects and other arthropods, occasionally plant material or eggs, as suggested for other family members. This food flexibility would have been beneficial in arid and seasonal environments.

== Discovery and naming ==
In 1993, a joint expedition by the American Museum of Natural History and the Mongolian Academy of Sciences discovered near Ukhaa Tolgod, the Flaming Cliffs, a skeleton of a small theropod. It was prepared by Amy Davidson. Though in subsequent years its traits were inserted in some data matrices of phylogenetic analyses, a description of the fossil was never published.

In 2017, the type species Almas ukhaa was named and described by Pei Rui, Mark Norell, Daniel Barta, Gabriel Bever, Michael Pittman and Xu Xing. The generic name refers to the almas, "wild man" in Mongolian, a man-like creature from Mongolian folklore. The specific name refers to its provenance.

The holotype, IGM 100/1323, was found in a layer of the Djadochta Formation dating from the late Campanian. It consists of a partial skeleton with skull. The skull, better preserved, was found disarticulated from the postcrania, but was considered to have belonged to the same individual. Parts of the skull roof, as well as the lower jaws, were found disconnected from the remainder of the head. The postcranial skeleton contains three sacral vertebrae, eleven front tail vertebrae, belly ribs, parts of the pelvis and parts of the hindlimbs, which lack the toes. It represents a subadult individual. Near the skeleton egg shells have been found of the Prismatoolithidae type. Such eggs have earlier been referred to Troodontidae.

== See also ==
- 2017 in archosaur paleontology
