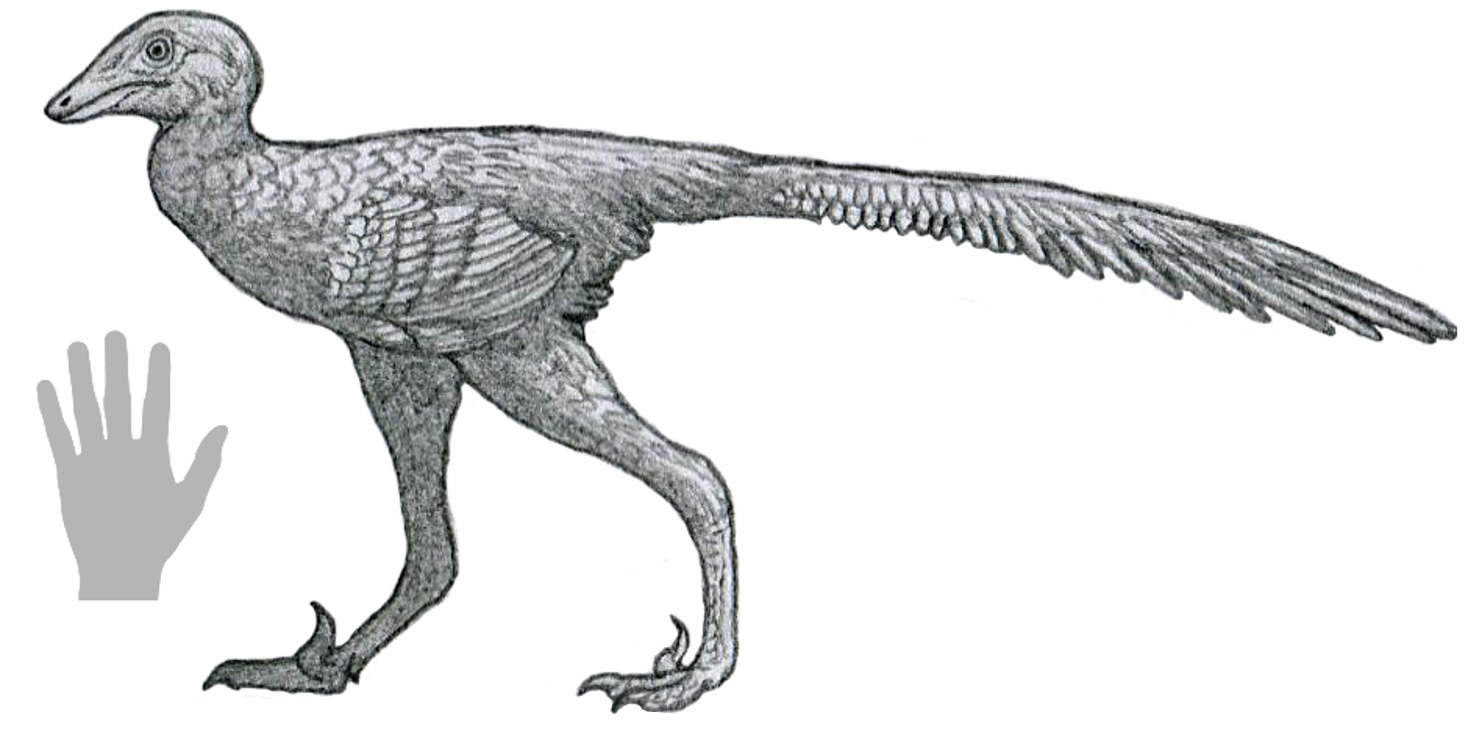
- Life reconstruction

Scientific classification
- Kingdom: Animalia
- Phylum: Chordata
- Class: Reptilia
- Clade: Dinosauria
- Clade: Saurischia
- Clade: Theropoda
- Family: †Troodontidae
- Subfamily: †Sinovenatorinae
- Genus: †Daliansaurus; Shen et al., 2017

Type species
- Daliansaurus liaoningensis Shen et al., 2017

= Daliansaurus =

Daliansaurus Temporal range: Barremian, 126 Ma

Extinct genus of dinosaurs

Daliansaurus (meaning "Dalian reptile") is a genus of small troodontid theropod dinosaur, measuring approximately 1 metre (3 ft 3 in) long, from the Early Cretaceous of China. It contains a single species, D. liaoningensis, named in 2017 by Shen and colleagues from a nearly complete skeleton preserved in three dimensions. Daliansaurus is unusual in possessing an enlarged claw on the fourth digit of the foot, in addition to the "sickle claw" found on the second digit of the feet of most paravians. It also has long metatarsal bones, and apparently possesses bird-like uncinate processes (a first among troodontids). In the Lujiatun Beds of the Yixian Formation, a volcanically-influenced region with a cold climate, Daliansaurus lived alongside its closest relatives - Sinovenator, Sinusonasus, and Mei, with which it forms the group Sinovenatorinae.

== Description ==
Daliansaurus is a small, lightly-built, and most likely feathered troodontid measuring approximately 1 metre (3 ft 3 in) in length, similar in size to Sinovenator and Sinusonasus. Typical of mature troodontids, the neural arches are fused to the vertebral centra in the dorsal (trunk) vertebrae of the only known specimen. Overall, Daliansaurus is very similar to Sinovenator, Sinusonasus, and Mei, its closest relatives, but differs from them in subtle ways.

=== Skull and vertebrae ===
The skull of Daliansaurus, which measures 13.8 centimetres (5.4 in) long, is proportionally larger than that of Mei. Daliansaurus also has a smaller nostril. The projection of the premaxilla above the nostril is flattened instead of rod-like like in Sinovenator, while another projection below the nostril is straight like Sinusonasus but unlike Sinovenator. There are two openings of the skull in front of the eyes: the teardrop-shaped premaxillary fenestra, and the large, oval antorbital fenestra. Like Mei, Sinovenator, and Sinornithoides but unlike Sinusonasus, the bottom edge of the lower jaw is straight and not convex. There are at least 21 tooth positions in the upper jaw and 24 in the lower; the latter is less than Sinovenator (27) and other troodontids. Like Sinovenator, however, teeth towards the back of the mouth have small serrations on their rear edges. The four premaxillary teeth are not recurved but D-shaped.

Daliansaurus has at least nine cervical vertebrae, probably thirteen dorsal vertebrae, five sacral vertebrae, and at least twenty-eight caudal vertebrae in the tail. Out of the sacral vertebrae, the fifth has the widest transverse processes in Daliansaurus, while the third is the widest in Sinovenator. The front margin of the process is also less strongly concave in Daliansaurus. The ribs of two of the dorsal vertebrae unusually appear to bear uncinate processes, in the form of curved and rod-like projections similar to those of Velociraptor, Linheraptor, and Heyuannia. These structures are unprecedented among troodontids. Like Sinorthoides, the bottom end of the anterior caudal chevrons are long, plate-like, and directed backwards.

=== Limbs ===
The humerus of Daliansaurus is relatively long, with the deltopectoral crest taking up 24% of its length, similar to Sinovenator and Sinornithoides. There are three digits on the hand. The first metacarpal bone is strongly curved in the vertical plane, more so than Sinornithoides; meanwhile, the second metacarpal is shorter than the third, which the opposite is true in both Sinovenator and Sinusonasus. Further below, he first digit of the hand is the most robust, and the claw of that digit bears a distinctly deep groove on its side. Meanwhile, the claw of the third digit is the smallest.

Daliansaurus has an ilium that is proportionally larger compared to the femur than either Sinornithoides or Mei. The two halves of the ilium are distinctly separated starting at the level of the third sacral, like Mei, albeit by a shorter distance. The bottom edge of the rear of the ilium is very concave, instead of being flat like Sinovenator. On the femur, which is strongly bowed, the process known as the lateral crest is lower than another process, the posterior trochanter, whereas they are at the same level in Sinornithoides. Like Sinornithoides, the tibia is about 1.4 times the length of the femur; it is smaller in Sinovenator, at 1.25 times the length of the femur.

Proportionally, Daliansaurus has much longer metatarsal bones than other troodontids. Like Sinovenator, the outer condyle at the bottom of the first metatarsal is larger than the inner one. The second metatarsal is unusually shorter than the fourth, with the bottom end of the second terminating before the trochlea or "knuckle" of the fourth; the opposite is the case in Sinovenator and Sinusonasus. The third metatarsal is partially obscured from behind by the fourth, unlike Tochisaurus; this is only partially caused by crushing of the fossil.

Among troodontids, Daliansaurus is best distinguished by the large claw on the fourth (outermost) digit of its foot. While troodontids are well known for the sickle-like claws on the second digits of their feet, the claw on the fourth digit of Daliansaurus is the same length as the second, and is also considerably more robust. However, the flexor tubercle, a muscular attachment, is not well-developed on the fourth claw.

== Discovery and naming ==
Daliansaurus is known from a single nearly-complete skeleton preserved in three dimensions. Parts of the specimen had been reconstructed and do not represent genuine fossil material, including the back of the skull and the rear portion of the lower jaw. Furthermore, the shoulder girdles are missing from the fossil, as is the right hindlimb; the left humerus, most of the pelvis, and the last few caudal vertebrae are buried in the surrounding matrix. The head and neck of the fossil are curled backwards, while the tail itself is curved forwards; the left arm is extended while the right arm is tucked inwards. The specimen was found in Early Cretaceous (~126 Ma old, dating to the Barremian epoch) volcanic deposits of the Lujiatun Beds of the Yixian Formation, in the village of Lujiatun near Beipiao, Liaoning, China. It is stored in the Dalian Natural History Museum (DNHM) in Dalian, Liaoning, under the specimen number DNHM D2885.

In 2017, DNHM D2885 was described in a research paper published in Acta Geologica Sinica and authored by Shen Caizhi, Lü Junchang, Liu Sizhao, Martin Kundrát, Stephen Brusatte, and Gao Hailong. They named the genus Daliansaurus after the city of Dalian, where the fossil is stored, and they named the type species after the province of Liaoning. Later, Shen, Lü, Gao, and Kundrát published a histological analysis of the ulna and radius of DNHM D2885, along with Masato Hoshino and Kentaro Uesugi, in the journal Historical Biology. For this analysis, they destructively sampled thin sections from the midshaft portion of the bones.

== Classification ==
A phylogenetic analysis was conducted by Shen and colleagues, who modified the Theropod Working Group dataset to add Daliansaurus and Sinusonasus. They used the analysis to identify traits that allowed Daliansaurus to be placed in the Troodontidae, concurring with previous assessments: the teeth are numerous and closely packed; the bar of the premaxilla separating the nostrils is flattened; there is a groove on the side of the dentary in the lower jaw; the neural spines are replaced by shallow grooves towards the end of the tail; and the metatarsals are asymmetrical, with the fourth being more robust than the second. The analysis also found that Daliansaurus formed a distinct evolutionary radiation along with other troodontids in the Yixian Formation: Mei, Sinovenator, and Sinusonasus. This group, which was named the Sinovenatorinae, was united by a synapomorphy not observable for Daliansaurus, the possession of a wide and flattened fourth metatarsal.

Within the Sinovenatorinae, Sinovenator, Sinusonasus, and Daliansaurus formed a subgroup to the exclusion of Mei. Several characteristics distinguish this subgroup, but were used by Shen and colleagues to diagnose the wider Sinovenatorinae: the premaxilla is only 10% the length of the maxilla at the bottom of the jaw; there is a contact between the premaxilla and the nasal bone below the level of the nostril; there are no serrations on the front edges of some teeth; the articular processes known as zygapophyses are unfused in the sacrals; and the process known as the antitrochanter is located behind and above the hip socket, or acetabulum. Finally, the analysis united Daliansaurus and Sinusonasus to the exclusion of Sinovenator, with the two sharing the bifurcation of the chevrons at both ends near the end of the tail; and the fusion of the greater and lesser trochanters on the femur into a continuous trochanteric crest.

The results of the analysis conducted by Shen and colleagues are shown below.

- Deinonychosauria
  - Dromaeosauridae
  - Troodontidae
    - - Eosinopteryx
      - Anchiornis
      - - Aurornis
        - Xiaotingia
    - - IGM 100/44
      - Byronosaurus
      - Xixiasaurus
      - - Almas
        - - IGM 100/1128
          - Jinfengopteryx
      - Sinovenatorinae
        - Mei
        - - Sinovenator
          - - Daliansaurus
            - Sinusonasus
      - - Sinornithoides
        - - Troodon
          - - Zanabazar
            - Saurornithoides

== Paleobiology ==
The long metatarsals present in Daliansaurus suggest that its running capabilities were better-developed than those of other troodontids. At the same time, the possible presence of uncinate processes on its ribs would have provided reinforcement for the rib cage, as well as an increase in the effectiveness of the muscles involved in breathing, as in modern birds.

=== Histology ===
Thin sections from the ulna and radius of the holotype specimen DNHM D2885 indicate that the bones are devoid of secondary osteons, or osteons formed through bone remodeling. Seasonal bone growth is apparent through the thin sections; three lines of arrested growth (LAGs) separate the cortical bone into four distinct zones within the radius, indicating that the individual was at least four years of age when it died. (There appear to only be two LAGs within the ulna.) These estimates were to considered to be lower bounds, because expansion of the medullary cavity within the bone could have obliterated additional LAGs. The seasonal growth may have been triggered by periods of low temperature; a similar phenomenon is observed among modern animals living in cold climates, including even endothermic mammals. However, the individual probably died during a warm period, based on the tightly spaced deposition and the presence of primary osteons near the outer surface of the bone.

Across the four zones, the neurovascular canals are denser in the first zone than in subsequent zones, indicating that growth was most intensive during the first year of life and rapidly decreased later on. Subsequent minor fluctuations in growth rate are reflected by alternating bands of osteons and avascular bone (i.e. bone lacking neurovascular canals). Thin peripheral growth bands are visible between the LAGs in the outer two zones of the radius, which constitute an external fundamental system (EFS). The presence of an EFS suggests minimal growth rates, indicating that the individual may have reached skeletal maturity at this size. However, the presence of some neurovascular canals near the surface periosteal layer, as well as some ill-defined osteons in the third zone, provide evidence that growth had still not finalized at the time of death. Overall, anatomical and histological evidence suggests that the individual grew quickly, but was only in the late subadult stage of life. The three-phase model of bone growth - rapid growth followed by slowed growth and formation of the EFS - is also seen in Stenonychosaurus.

== Paleoecology ==
The Liaoning region of northeastern China has been one of the most productive fossil sites for understanding the evolution of feathered dinosaurs, including birds. All of the sinovenatorines - Sinovenator, Sinusonasus, Mei, and Daliansaurus - lived in the Lujiatun Beds of the Yixian Formation. Rather than strict coexistence, it is possible that they replaced each other over time, or were geographically and ecologically segregated. Shen and colleagues identified the sinovenatorines as a localized radiation of troodontids confined to Liaoning during the Early Cretaceous; a similar radiation occurred with the many microraptorine dromaeosaurids which lived at roughly the same place and time. Sinovenatorines also paralleled dromaeosaurids in the minute but taxonomically informative anatomical differences between different members of the group. However, it is possible that some of these differences may arise from individual or ontogenetic variation.

A wide variety of dinosaurs lived in the Lujiatun Beds alongside the sinovenatorines. These included the microraptorine Graciliraptor lujiatunensis; the oviraptorosaur Incisivosaurus gauthieri; the ornithomimosaurs Shenzhousaurus orientalis and Hexing qingyi; the proceratosaurid tyrannosauroid Dilong paradoxus; the titanosauriform sauropod Euhelopus sp., based on teeth; the ornithopod Jeholosaurus shangyuensis; and the ceratopsians Psittacosaurus lujiatunensis (including P. major and Hongshanosaurus houi) and Liaoceratops yanzigouensis. Psittacosaurus lujiatunensis was the most common, with thousands of specimens being known, followed by troodontids and Jeholosaurus shangyuensis. No fossils of birds are known from the Lujiatun Beds.

Mammals were also present in the Lujiatun Beds, including Acristatherium yanensis, Gobiconodon zofiae, Juchilestes liaoningensis, Maotherium asiaticus, Meemannodon lujiatunensis, Repenomamus giganticus, and R. robustus. The frogs Liaobatrachus zhaoi and Mesophryne beipiaoensis have also been found, along with the lizard Dalinghosaurus longidigitus. Many of the Lujiatun fossils exhibit exceptional three-dimensional preservation; the presence of tuffaceous sandstone and conglomerate debris flow deposits suggests that the animals were killed suddenly and catastrophically by lahar from a nearby shield volcano. Fossils of invertebrates and plants are absent from the Lujiatun Beds, but pollen from coniferous plants dominates the contemporary Jianshangou Beds. Mean annual air temperatures were cold in the region during the Barremian and Aptian epochs, being as cold as 10 °C (50 °F).

== See also ==
- Timeline of troodontid research
- 2017 in archosaur paleontology
