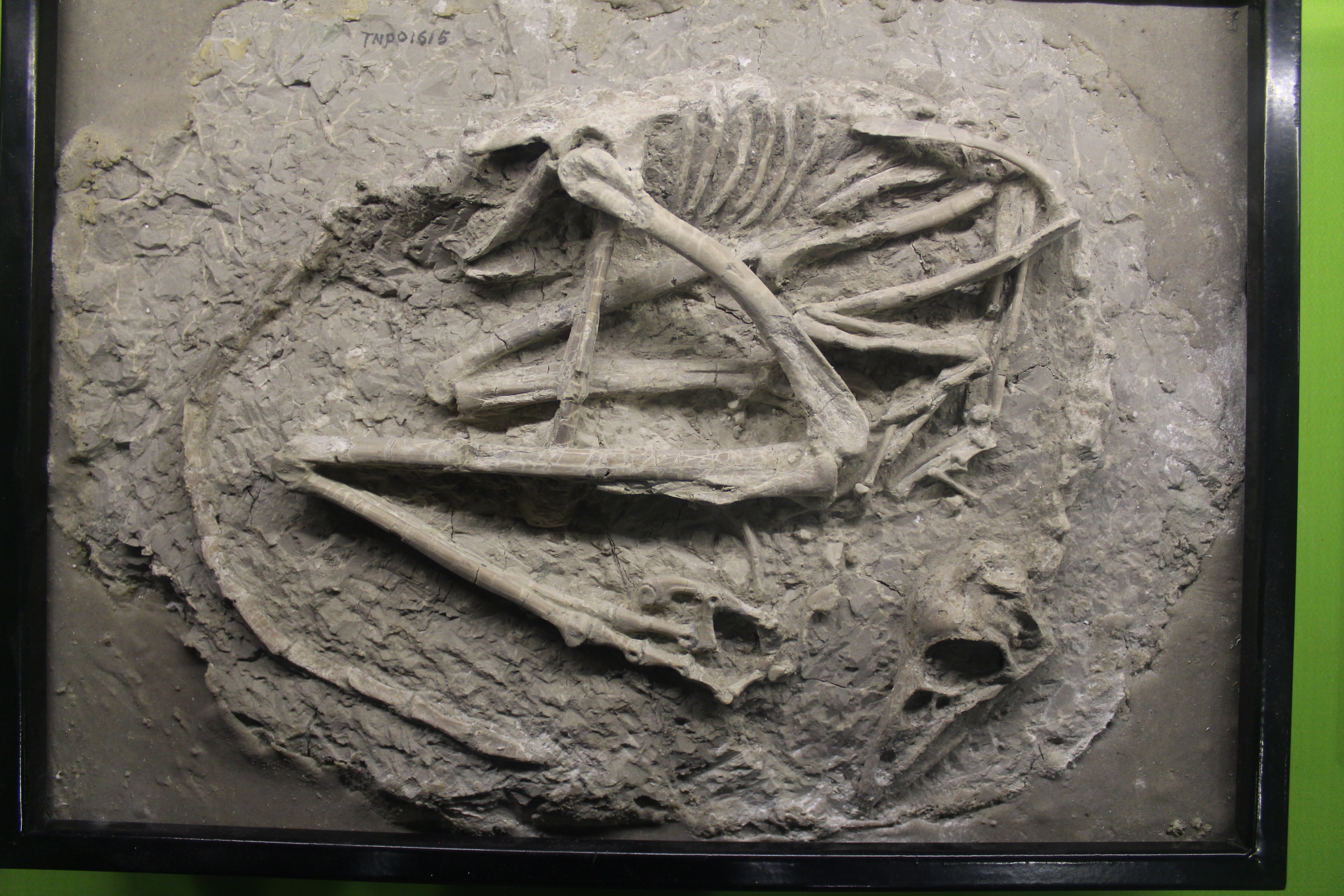
- Fossil specimen, Tianjin Natural History Museum

Scientific classification
- Kingdom: Animalia
- Phylum: Chordata
- Class: Reptilia
- Clade: Dinosauria
- Clade: Saurischia
- Clade: Theropoda
- Family: †Troodontidae
- Subfamily: †Sinovenatorinae
- Genus: †Sinovenator; Xu et al., 2002
- Species: †S. changii

Binomial name
- †Sinovenator changii Xu et al., 2002

= Sinovenator =

Sinovenator Temporal range: Early Cretaceous, 125 Ma

Extinct genus of dinosaurs

Sinovenator (lit. 'Chinese hunter') is a genus of troodontid dinosaur from China. It is from the early Cretaceous Period.

== Discovery and naming ==
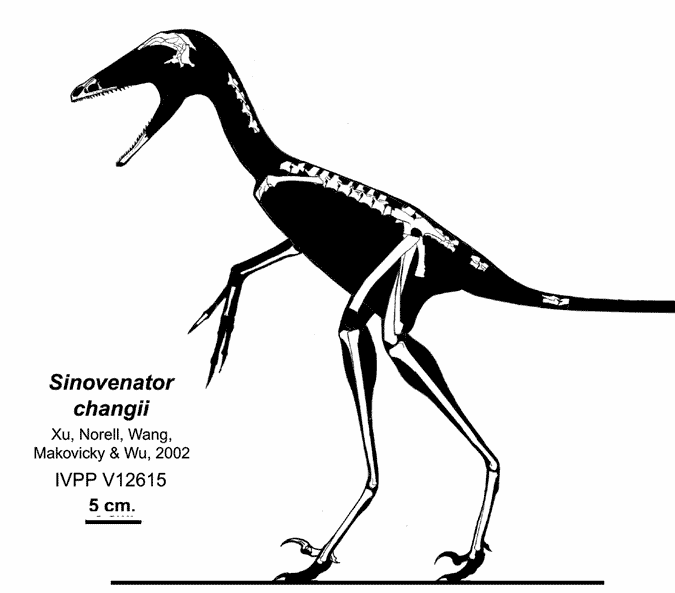
Known elements of the holotype

Two specimens of a troodontid were described in 2002. They are both housed in the Institute of Vertebrate Paleontology and Paleoanthropology, under the specimen numbers IVPP V 12615 and IVPP V 12583. Xu Xing, Mark Norell, and colleagues authored the study describing them, finding the specimens to represent a new taxon, for which was chosen the binomial Sinovenator changii. The generic name was derived from the Latin word Sinae, for China (in Neo-Latin), and venator 'hunter'. Meemann Chang is honoured by the species name for her contributions to the study of the Jehol Fauna. As Chang is a female researcher, the epithet should have been "changae"; however, such mistakes cannot be emended according to the rules of the ICZN and therefore forms such as "Sinovenator changae" or "Sinovenator changiae" that sometimes appear in the literature are incorrect.

The type specimen or holotype of Sinovenator changii is IVPP 12615, a partial skull and disarticulated skeleton. An additional specimen was by the original publication scientifically described and assigned as the paratype of the species: an incomplete but articulated postcranial skeleton, numbered IVPP 12583. A third specimen was referred: IVPP V14322, a fragmentary skeleton. All three are in the collection of the IVPP in Beijing, China. However, Sinovenator fossils appear to be common in the Lujiatun Beds. In a 2006 survey of the Jehol Biota, Xu and Norell reported that hundreds of undescribed specimens are known. The fossils have been preserved three-dimensionally, not strongly compressed on a slab.

In 2014, the wrist of one specimen was described, IVPP V14009, an adult. In 2018, PMOL-AD00102, consisting of a partial skull and mandibles, and six cervical vertebrae, was referred to the taxon.

== Description ==
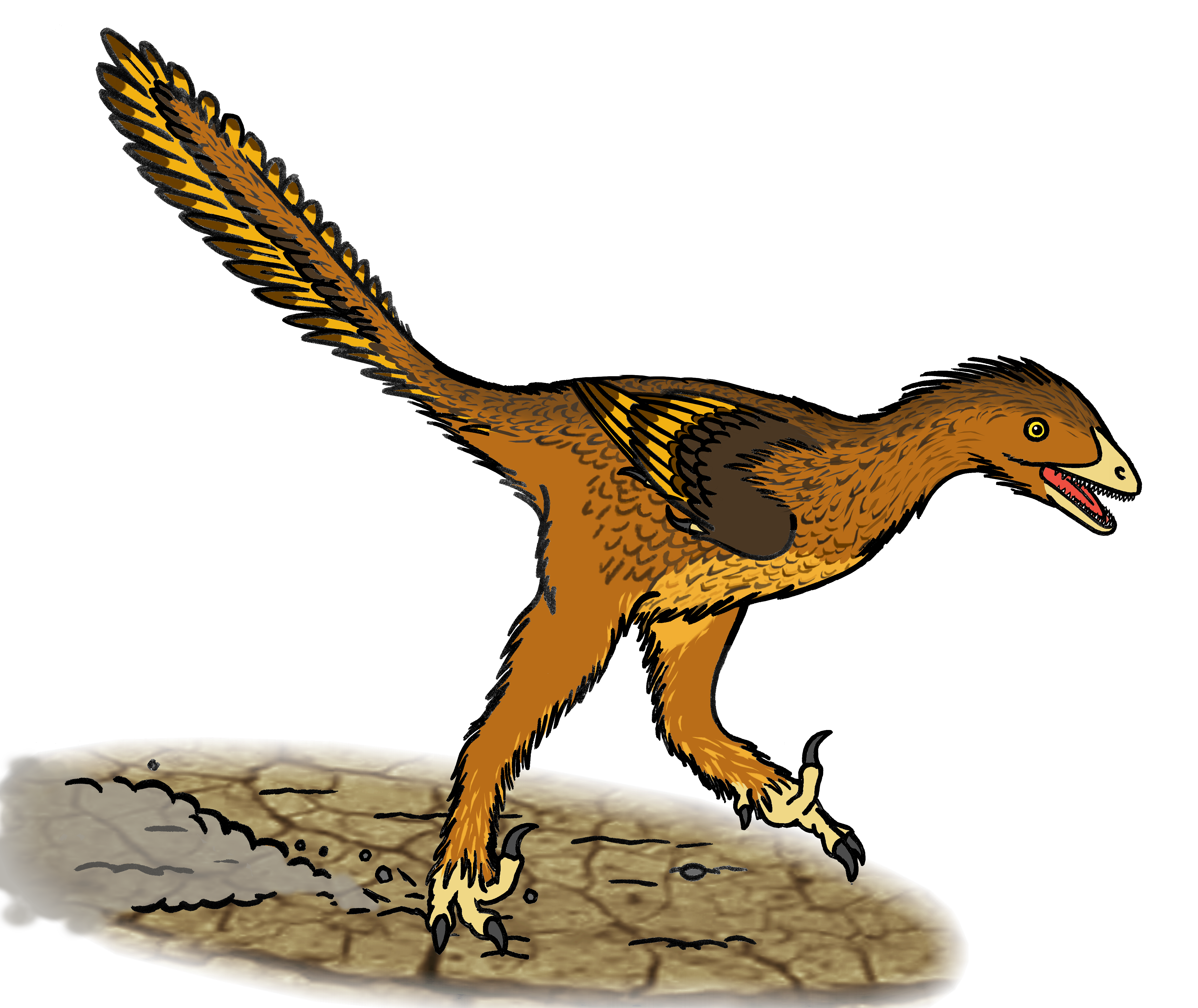
Life restoration of sprinting Sinovenator

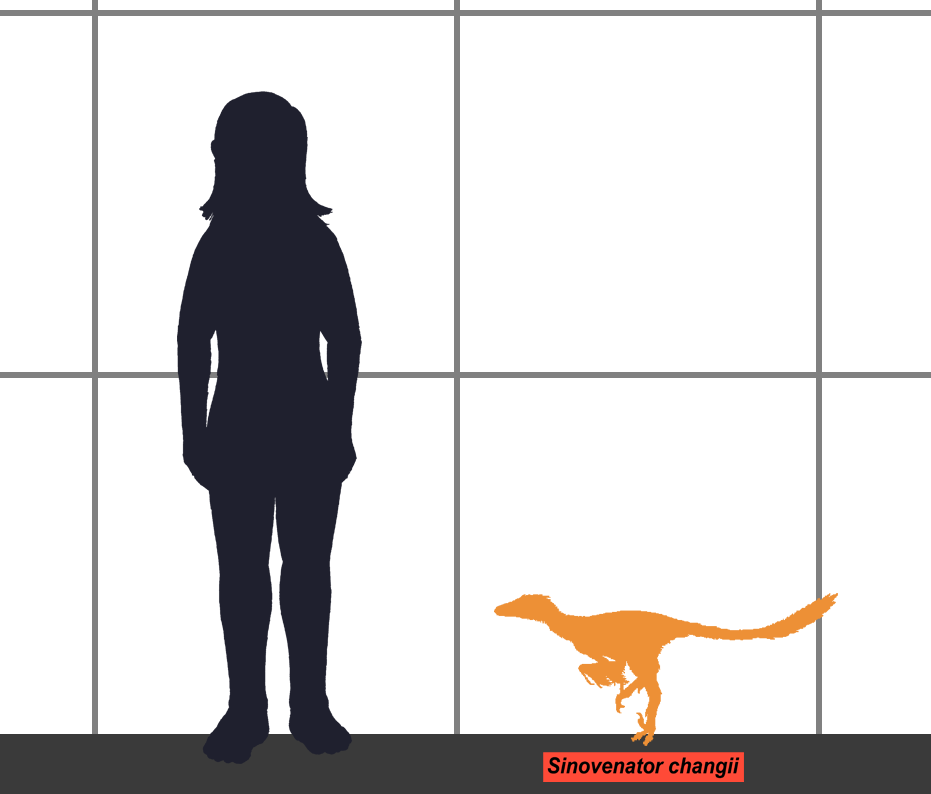
Size of Sinovenator compared to a human

Sinovenator is a troodontid, a group of small, bird-like, gracile maniraptorans. All troodontids have many unique features of the skull, such as closely spaced teeth in the lower jaw, and large numbers of teeth. Troodontids have sickle-claws and raptorial hands, and some of the highest non-avian encephalization quotients, meaning they were behaviourally advanced and had keen senses. The holotype individual of Sinovenator was about the size of a chicken, less than a metre long. In 2010, Gregory S. Paul estimated the weight of a one metre long individual at 2.5 kilogrammes. However, the holotype and paratype are subadults; specimens are known with about twice their length. This makes it one of the larger species of troodontids in the ecosystem of the Yixian Formation, the formation where it was found.

In the original description some distinguishing traits or autapomorphies were established. The front edge of the antorbital fenestra, the large skull opening in front of the eye socket, is straight and vertically oriented. The frontal bone shows a vertical ridge touching the lacrimal bone. The surangular in the lower jaw has a T-shaped cross-section. The shinbone has a vertical ridge on the upper outer side, the crista cnemialis, touching a lower vertical ridge, the crista fibularis.

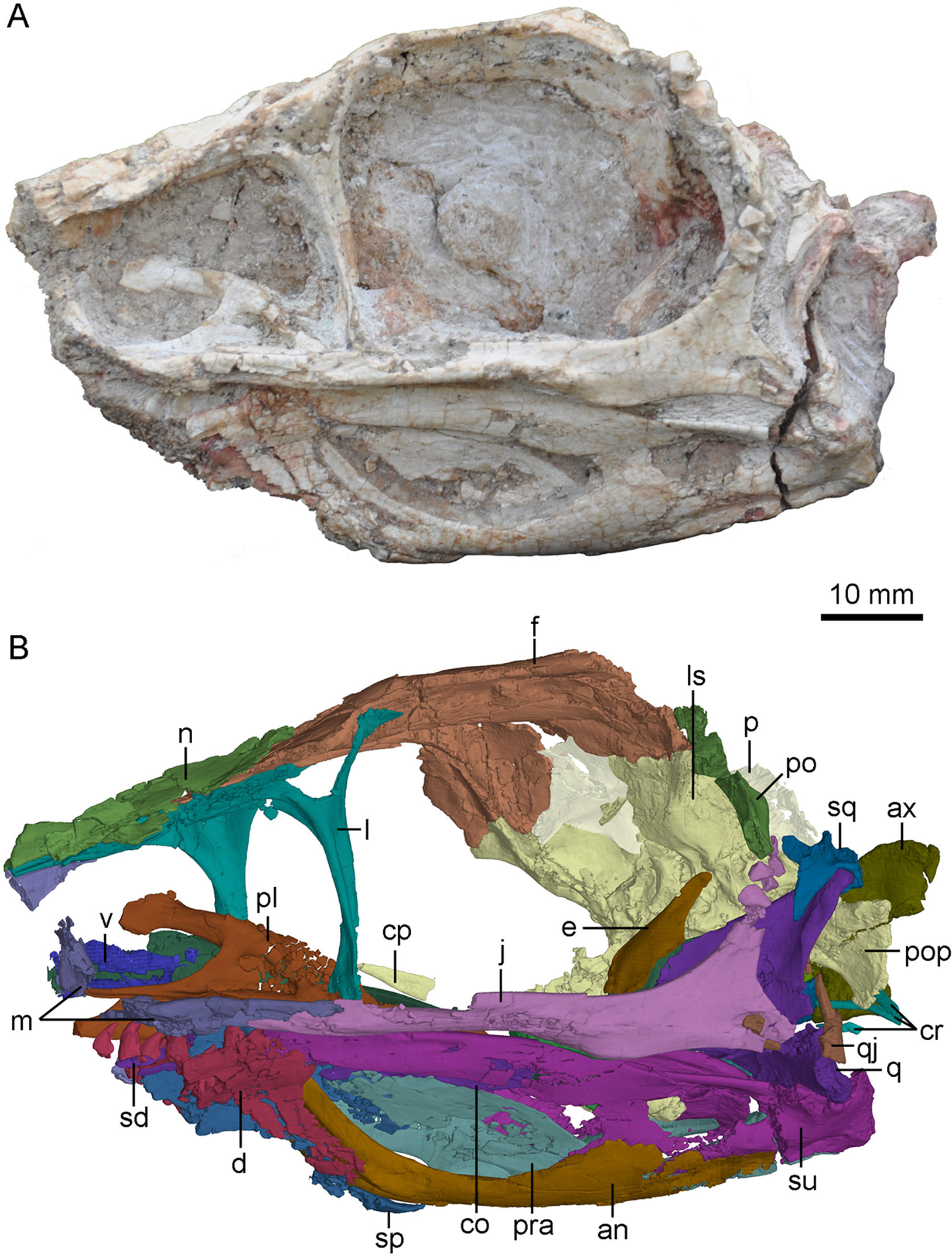
Photo and CT scan of skull PMOL-AD00102

There is a number of other notable traits. The upper branch of the praemaxilla excludes the maxilla from the nostril. The premaxillary teeth lack denticles; those on the maxillary teeth are small. The maxillary tooth row is positioned at some distance from the jaw rim. A fenestra promaxillaris is present. The branch of the jugal towards the postorbital is long, slender and inclined to the rear. The foramen magnum is much larger than the occipital condyle. The braincase lacks a recessus suboticus and a crista otosphenoidalis. The rear of the pterygoid has a secondary, rod-like, process. The front dentary teeth are closely packed. The rear of the surangular is extraordinarily deep.

Five sacrals are present, those of the middle being clearly larger. The ilium is relatively small. The ischium is bird-like: small with a low obturator process and processes on the upper and lower rear edge. The shinbone is wide at the top and has a roughly rectangular lower joint surface. The fourth metatarsal is not strongly developed but the second metatarsal is small. The third metatarsal is pinched at the top but still visible at the upper front of the metatarsus, conforming to the subarctometatarsal condition.

== Phylogeny ==
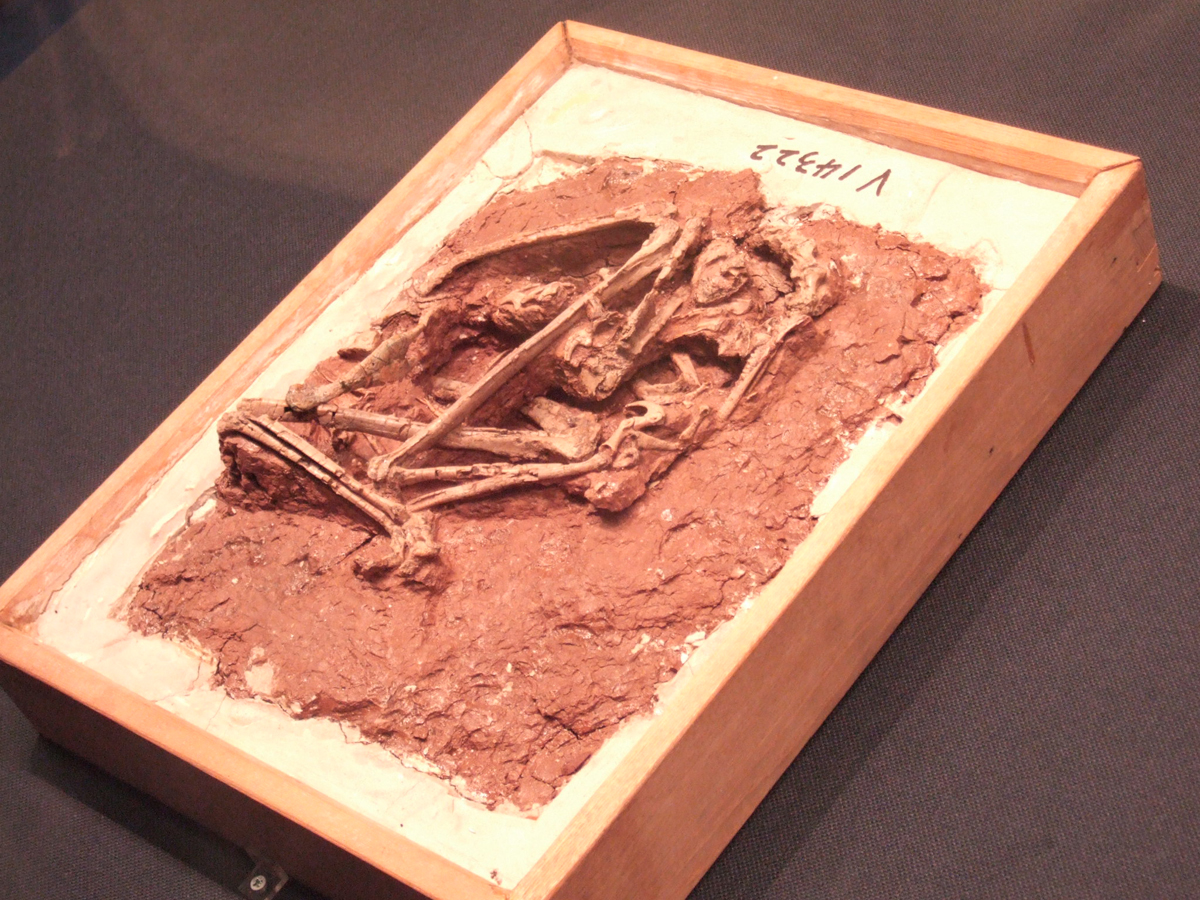
Specimen IVPP V14322

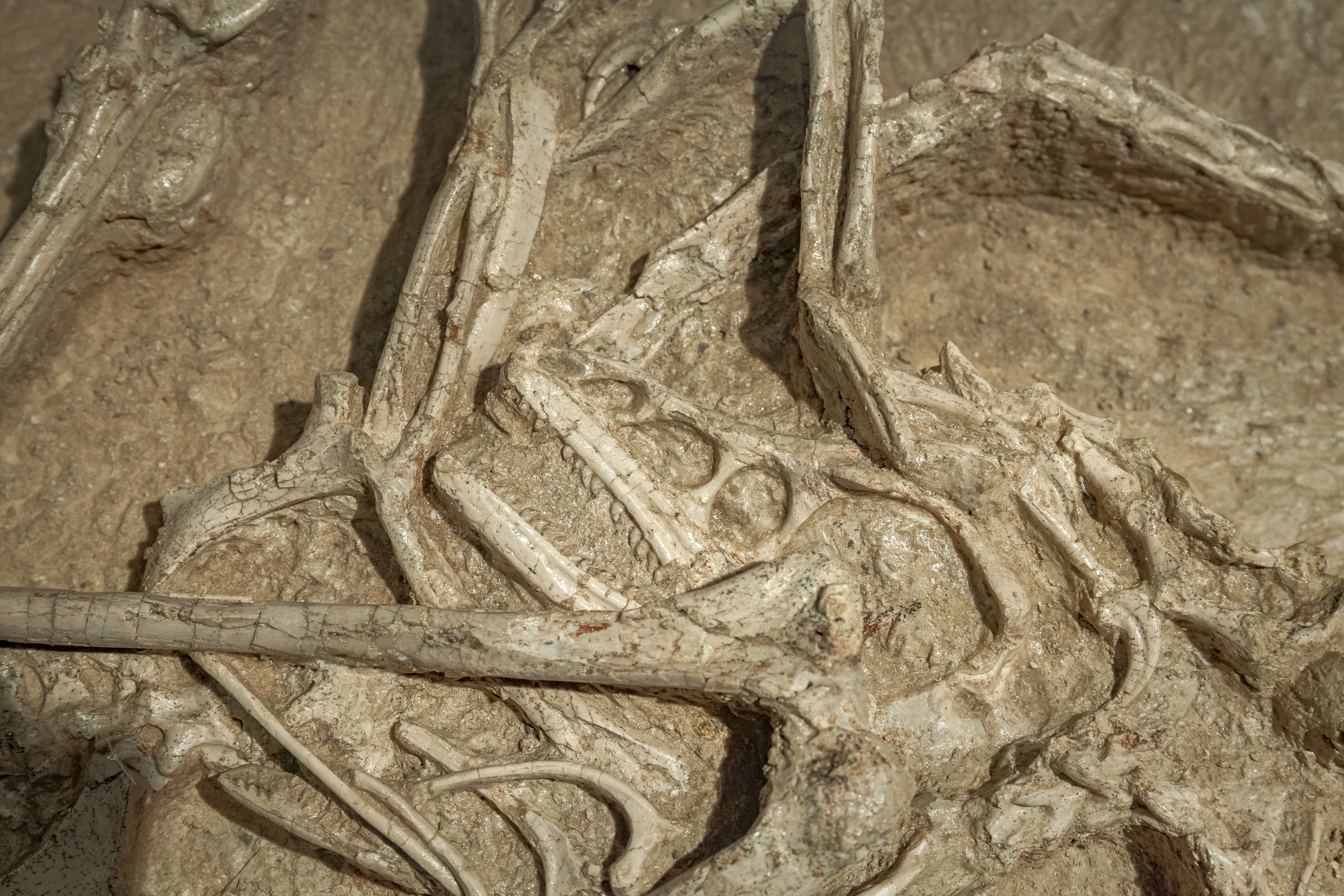
Details of specimen BMNHC Ph798, the skull is partially covered by fibula and tibia

In 2002 Sinovenator was placed in the Troodontidae.

Sinovenator is a basal or "primitive" troodontid, and shares features with the most basal dromaeosaurids and Avialae. It thus was one of the first fossil specimens conclusively demonstrating the close relation of these three groups in the overarching Paraves. A typical basal trait is the orientation of the pubic bone to the rear, similar to the situation in the Dromaeosauridae and basal birds. This proves that the orientation to the front with later troodontids, is a reversal and not a trait directly inherited from older theropods that also possess a forward pointing pubic bone. Another basal character is the lack of a bulla, a swollen region on the underside of the braincase. This indicates that the similar bulla with the Ornithomimosauria presents a case of parallel evolution and is not a proof for a Bullatosauria, an earlier presumed close relationship between troodontids and ornithomimosaurs.

Originally, the basal position of Sinovenator seemed to be corroborated by a very high age, the fossils being assumed to date from the Hauterivian. Later research however, indicated that the layers were younger.

In 2017, a study by Shen et al., describing the genus Daliansaurus found Sinovenator to form a monophyletic group with other troodontids from the Yixian Formation, named Sinovenatorinae. A wide, flattened fourth metatarsal was found to be a synapomorphy uniting this group. The study recovered the following cladogram:

- Deinonychosauria
  - Dromaeosauridae
  - Troodontidae
    - - Eosinopteryx
      - Anchiornis
      - - Aurornis
        - Xiaotingia
    - - IGM 100/44
      - Byronosaurus
      - Xixiasaurus
      - - Almas
        - - IGM 100/1128
          - Jinfengopteryx
      - Sinovenatorinae
        - Mei
        - - Sinovenator
          - - Daliansaurus
            - Sinusonasus
      - - Sinornithoides
        - - Troodon
          - - Zanabazar
            - Saurornithoides

A 2018 study by Yin et al. instead found the Chinese troodontids to form an intermediate grade:

- Paraves
  - Avialae
  - - Archaeopteryx
    - Wellnhoferia
    - - - Xiaotingia
        - Anchiornis
      - Dromaeosauridae
      - Troodontidae
        - Mei
        - - Sinovenator
          - - Sinusonasus
            - - IGM 100/44
              - Sinornithoides
              - Byronosaurus
              - - Zanabazar
                - Saurornithoides
                - Troodon

== See also ==
- Timeline of troodontid research
