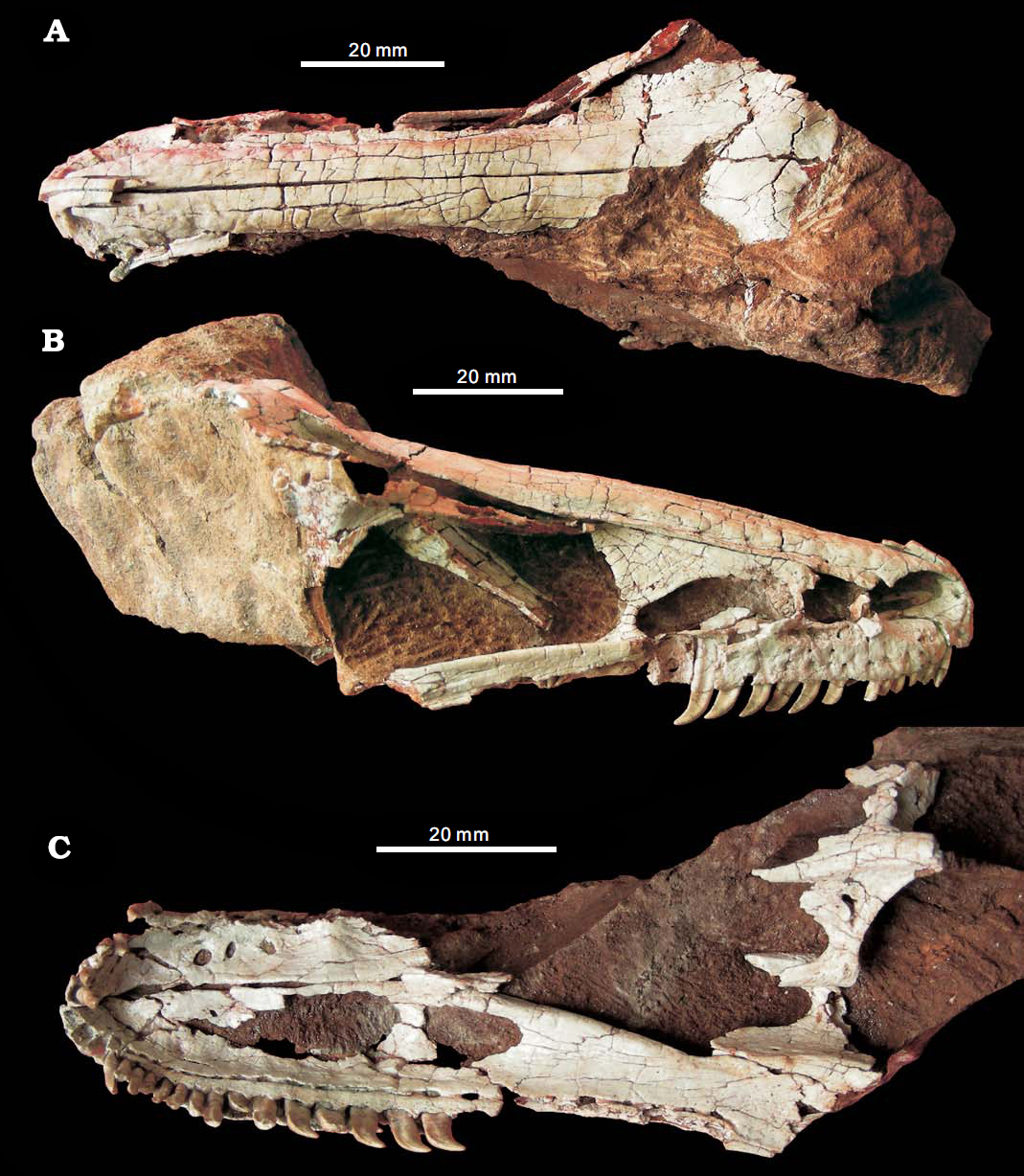
- Holotype skull shown from above (A), the right side (B), and below (C)

Scientific classification
- Kingdom: Animalia
- Phylum: Chordata
- Class: Reptilia
- Clade: Dinosauria
- Clade: Saurischia
- Clade: Theropoda
- Family: †Troodontidae
- Genus: †Xixiasaurus; Lü et al., 2010
- Species: †X. henanensis

Binomial name
- †Xixiasaurus henanensis Lü et al., 2010

= Xixiasaurus =

Xixiasaurus Temporal range: Late Cretaceous, 86 Ma

Genus of dinosaur

Xixiasaurus (/ˌʃiːʃiəˈsɔːrəs/) is a genus of troodontid dinosaur that lived during the Late Cretaceous period in what is now China. The only known specimen was discovered in Xixia County, Henan Province, in central China, and became the holotype of the new genus and species Xixiasaurus henanensis in 2010. The names refer to the areas of discovery, and can be translated as "Henan Xixia lizard". The specimen consists of an almost complete skull (except for the hindmost portion), part of the lower jaw, and teeth, as well as a partial right forelimb.

Xixiasaurus is estimated to have been 1.5 metres (5 ft) long and to have weighed 8 kilograms (18 lb). As a troodontid, it would have been bird-like and lightly built, with grasping hands and an enlarged sickle-shaped claw on the second toe. Its skull was long, with a long, low snout that formed a tapering U-shape when seen from below. The frontal bone of the forehead was dome-like in side view, which indicates it had an enlarged braincase. It differed from other troodontids in that the front of the dentary bone of the lower jaw was down-turned. Unlike in most troodontids, the teeth of Xixiasaurus did not have serrations; instead, their carinae (front and back edges) were smooth and sharp. It was distinct among troodontids in having 22 teeth in each maxilla (in other genera the maxillary tooth count was either higher or lower).

The precise relationships of Xixiasaurus with other troodontids are uncertain, but it had some similarities with Byronosaurus. Though troodontids with unserrated teeth were once thought to form a clade, the taxonomic significance of this feature has been questioned. Troodontids had large brains, keen senses, and were probably agile. There has been debate about their diet, with some researchers arguing that they were carnivorous, and others that they were omnivorous or herbivorous. The lack of serrated teeth in Xixiasaurus and some other troodontids indicates these were herbivorous, as they had lost the ability to slice meat. Xixiasaurus is known from the Majiacun Formation, the exact age of which is uncertain. These sedimentary rocks were deposited by braided streams and meandering streams, and are noted for containing abundant dinosaur eggs.

== Discovery ==
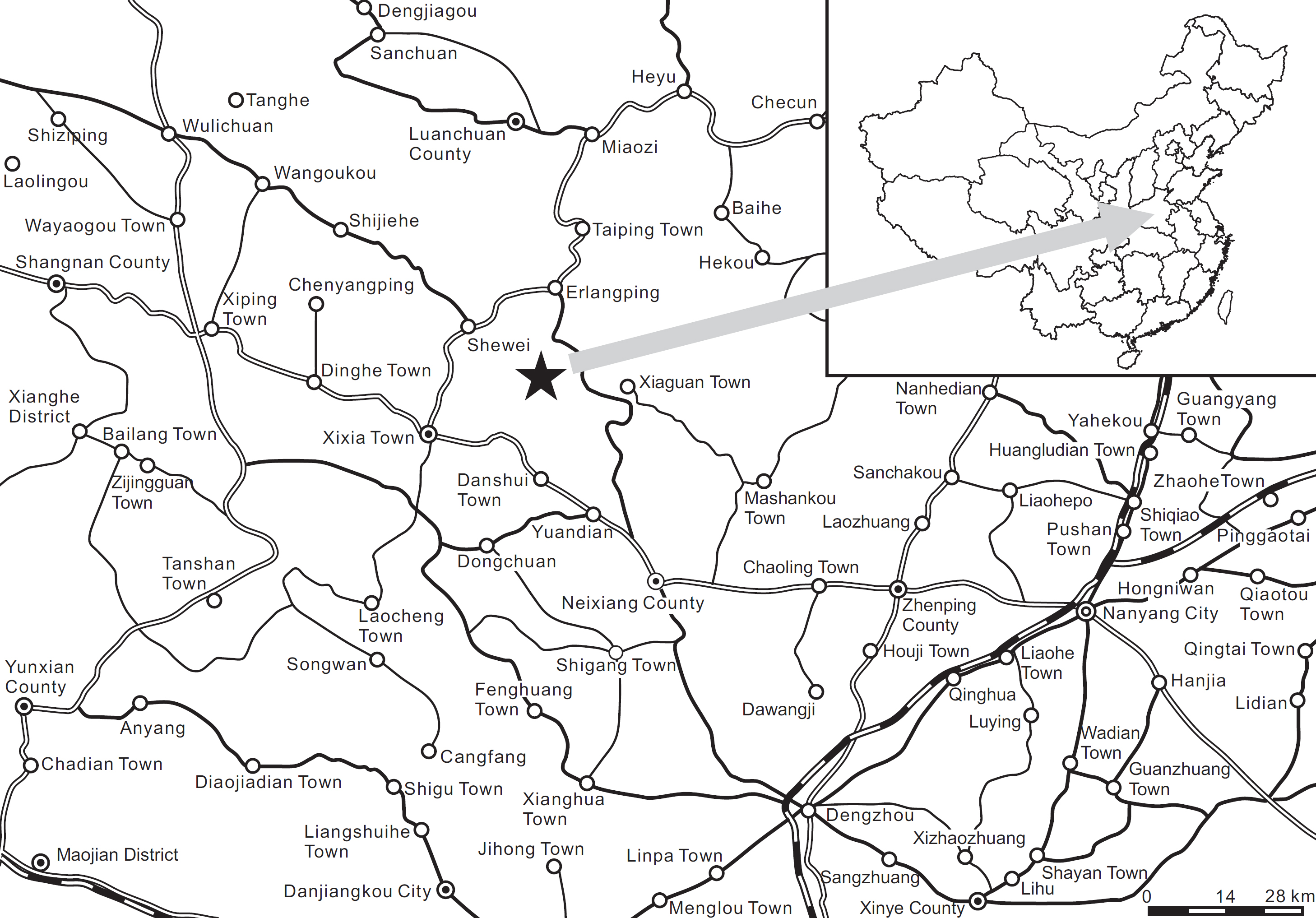
Map showing the type locality (★) in Henan Province of China

The holotype specimen (catalogued as HGM 41HIII−0201 in Henan Geological Museum, Zhengzhou) was discovered near Songgou Village, which is in the northeast region of Xixia County, in Henan Province of central China. This area of the Xixia Basin exposes the Majiacun Formation. In 2010, the specimen was described as the new genus and species Xixiasaurus henanensis by the palaeontologist Lü Junchang and colleagues. The generic name refers to Xixia County coupled with saurus, meaning "lizard", while the specific name refers to Henan Province. The full name can be translated as "Henan Xixia lizard". Remains of troodontids are very rare compared to those of other small theropod dinosaurs (only thirteen troodontid taxa were known at the time Xixiasaurus was named), and have mainly been found in Asia.

The holotype specimen is the only known Xixiasaurus fossil, and consists of an almost complete skull except for the hindmost portion, as well as a partial right forelimb. The connection between the frontal (forehead bone) and nasal (bone running at the upper length of the snout) bones is displaced, and part of the braincase is missing. Most of the snout is preserved, with the dentition of the right side being well-preserved. Only the front part of the left dentary bone (tooth-bearing bone of the mandible) and some of its broken teeth are preserved. Though several teeth are missing from both jaws, their original number can be determined in the upper jaw, since their sockets there are preserved. The forelimb (of which all preserved parts are articulated) consists of the middle part of the radius and ulna (bones of the lower arm), the extremity of the second and third metacarpals (hand bones), the complete first finger, and the first phalanx bone of the second finger. In 2014, the palaeontologist Takanobu Tsuihiji and colleagues stated that a bone Lü and colleagues had originally identified as the vomer (part of the palate) of Xixiasaurus was instead part of the premaxillae or maxillae (the main bones of the upper jaw), based on comparison with the vomer of the more complete troodontid Gobivenator.

== Description ==
Size compared to a human

Xixiasaurus is estimated to have been around 1.5 metres (5 ft) long, and to have weighed about 8 kilograms (18 lb). Since the nasal bones of the holotype specimen were not fused, it may not have been a mature individual. As a troodontid maniraptoran, it would have been bird-like, lightly built, with raptorial (grasping) hands and an enlarged sickle-shaped claw on the hyper-extendible second toe. Fossils of other troodontids, such as Jianianhualong, show that members of the group were covered in pennaceous feathers, with long feathers on the arms and legs, and frond-like feathering on the tail (similar to the avialan Archaeopteryx).

The skull of Xixiasaurus was long, similar to that of Byronosaurus overall, and the snout was distinctly long and low. The premaxillae were not fused to each other, and bore a few small pits on their side surfaces. When viewed from below, the front margin of the upper jaw formed a tapering U-shape, distinct from the shape in other troodontids; the U-shape tapered less in Byronosaurus and was very elongated in Sinornithoides, for example. Viewed from above, the nasal processes that extended hindwards from the premaxillae were wedged between the premaxillary processes of the nasal bones, which extended forwards. The nasal process of the premaxilla ended at the level of the hind margin of the external narial opening (bony nostril), and was quadrangular in cross-section rather than triangular, as in Byronosaurus. The nasal process of the premaxilla formed the upper hind corner of the narial opening, and Xixiasaurus was distinct in having an opening on the side surface at the base of the nasal process. The suture between the premaxilla and maxilla curved upwards from the front of the snout, and straightened out under the narial opening when seen from the side. The maxillary process of the premaxilla tapered hindwards and wedged between a small forwards-extended process of the maxilla and the main part of that bone. The maxilla was kept from being part of the margin of the narial opening by the maxillary process. The maxillary process of the premaxilla extended hindwards to the same level as the nasal process. Due to not being fused together, the premaxillae had a fissure along their lower midline. There were two small openings (connected to each other by a shallow groove) near the base of the third and fourth premaxillary teeth, but none near the first and second.

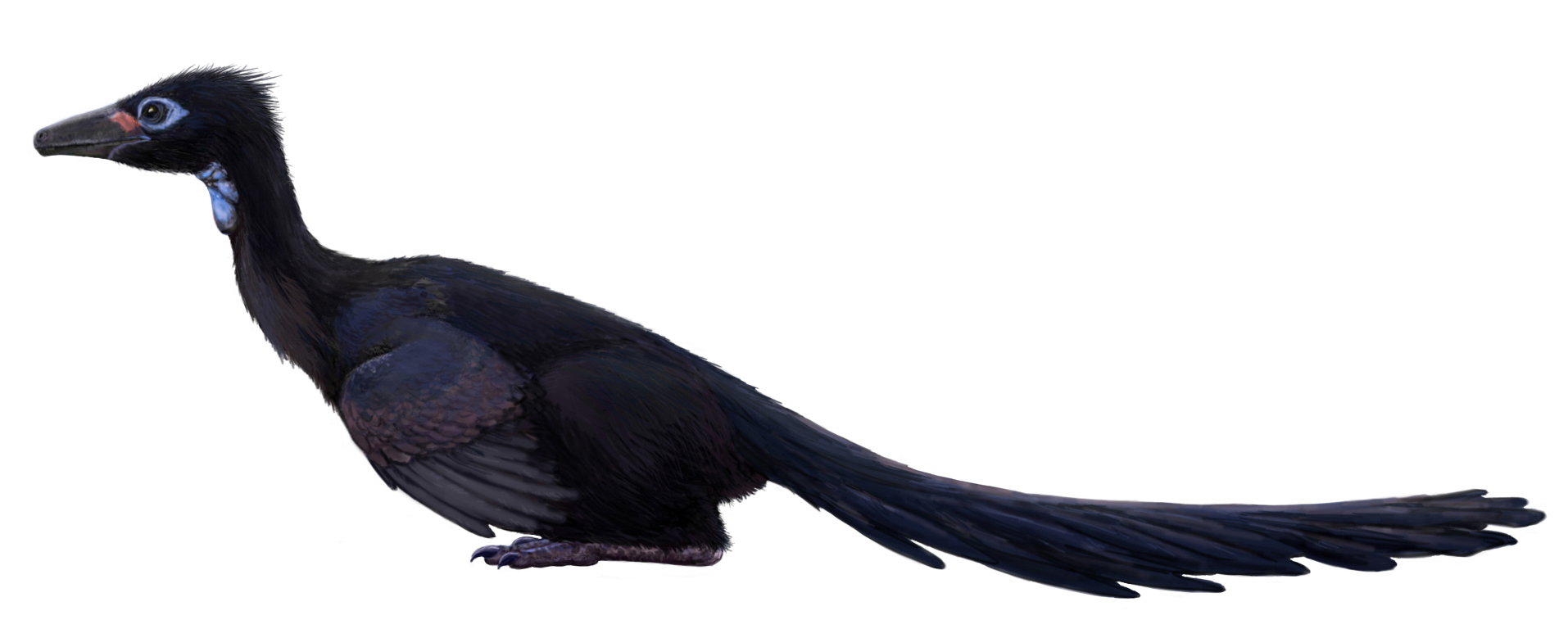
Life restoration, showing an individual in bird-like resting pose

The maxilla was much longer than high, forming most of the skull's side surface, and to the front, most of the lower margin of the narial opening. The narial opening was roughly oval, with its long axis (the longest stretch from its front to the back) being parallel with the lower margin of the maxilla. The side surface of the maxilla below the narial opening was covered with small pits and foramina (openings), as in Byronosaurus, and the row of these was just above and parallel to the margin of the tooth-row. The side surface of the maxilla had three large, elongated openings, called the anterior, maxillary, and antorbital fenestrae. The anterior fenestra appears to have been entirely enclosed by the maxilla, and there were two rows of small pits below it. The back of the maxillary fenestra had a bony wall called the interfenestral bar, which separated it from the antorbital fenestra, as in Byronosaurus. The antorbital fenestra (the largest of the three openings, located in front of the orbit) was rectangular in side view, and the part of the maxilla below it was low and did not have small foramina, unlike the front part. The maxillary teeth were placed along most of the lower margin of the antorbital fenestra. On the lower side, the maxilla formed an extensive internal shelf which contributed to a large secondary palate (which separated the nasal airways from the mouth), extending backwards from the contact with the premaxilla. The front part of the palatal shelf had three small openings, and there was a row of nutrient foramina (which allowed blood to supply the bone with nutrients) in a groove just above and parallel to the tooth row margin.

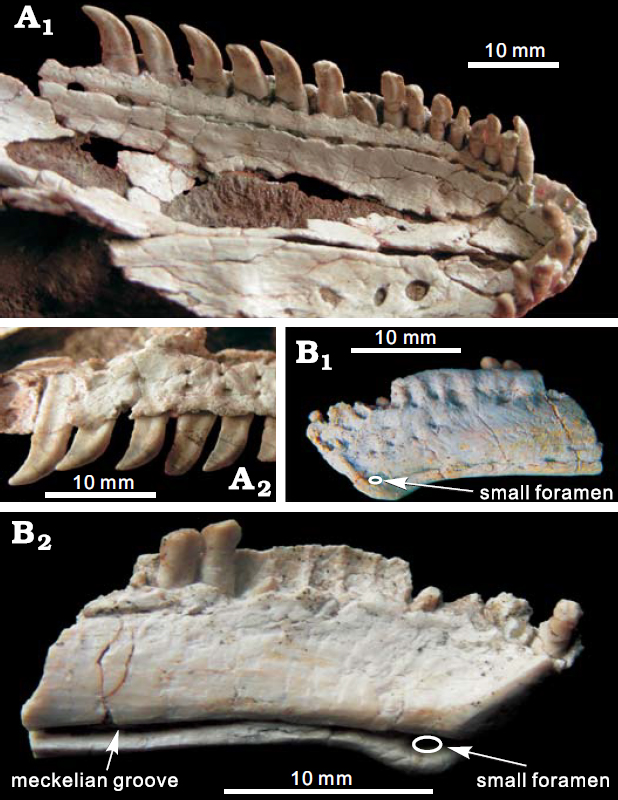
Parts of the upper (A) and lower (B) jaws of the holotype

The nasal bones were elongated, 100 millimetres (4 in) long and 8.8 millimetres (0.35 in) wide. They were not fused together, and covered the top of the rostrum (snout) for most of their length. At the front, the nasal formed the boundary at the lower back of the narial opening. The nasal sloped downwards at the front, whereas it flattened hindwards. The frontal bones were 65 millimetres (2.6 in) long, and were not fused. Each frontal was triangular when viewed from above, and as in other troodontids, the frontals were widest at the point where they contacted the postorbital bones (bone behind the eye socket). The frontal was overlapped by the nasal and lacrimal bones (bone in front of the eye socket) at the middle front, and its frontmost part contacted the hind end of the nasal. Seen from the side, the hind part of the frontal was dome-like, which indicates that Xixiasaurus had an enlarged braincase. The rim of the orbit (eye socket) was raised, with weak notches along the margins. The lacrimal bone was T-shaped in side view; its front process was very long and reached the hind margin of the antorbital fenestra, forming most of the latter's upper hind border, as in Byronosaurus.

It differed from other troodontids in that the front end of the dentary of the lower jaw was downturned (also called "a chin-like eminence"), similar to what is seen in therizinosaurian theropods. The mandibular symphysis (the area where the two halves of the mandible connected at the front) was short, and this region was slightly curved towards the middle. Two rows of foramina ran along the outer side of the dentary, just below the first seven dentary teeth (only one of the rows continued hindwards past the seventh of these teeth). The foramina lay in a groove, which is a distinct feature of troodontids, while the inner surface of the dentary was smooth. A narrow, deep Meckelian groove ran at the inner side of the dentary, just above its lower margin, towards the front of the mandibular symphysis. Just behind the symphysis and below the Meckelian groove, a distinct foramen was present, similar to the condition in Urbacodon. On the outer side of the dentary, at the level of the Meckelian groove, there was a shallow groove with elongated pits.

Unlike most troodontids, Xixiasaurus did not have serrations on its teeth, and their carinae (front and back edges) were instead smooth and sharp, as in Byronosaurus. Xixiasaurus had four closely packed teeth in each premaxilla, as in most other theropods, with roughly oval alveoli (tooth-sockets). The premaxillary teeth were smaller than the hindmost teeth of the maxilla. There was a distinct constriction between the crown and root of the premaxillary and frontmost ten maxillary teeth. The inner surfaces of the premaxillary tooth crowns were convex and the outer surfaces were somewhat concave, which created a D-shape when viewed in cross-section, a feature shared with a few other troodontids. It was distinct among troodontids in having 22 teeth in each maxilla (though not all teeth were preserved in the holotype, their number can be determined from the alveoli); other genera had either a higher or lower maxillary tooth count than Xixiasaurus. The first seven maxillary teeth were tightly packed and much smaller than those further back, and had distinct constrictions between their crowns and roots. The outer surfaces of the crowns had distinct grooves close to the carinae, similar to Urbacodon. The teeth curved backwards and were compressed from side to side, and the bases of the crowns were less expanded behind the tenth maxillary tooth. As in Byronosaurus, the maxillary teeth were heterodont (differentiated), with the fifteenth tooth being largest.

The radius bone of the lower arm was much thinner than the ulna. The third metacarpal was thinner than the second, and their outermost edges were at the same level, which indicates these two metacarpals were equal in length. The claw of the first finger was sharp, and had a large flexor tubercle (where a tendon was inserted). The first phalanx of the first finger was 3.6 centimetres (1.4 in) long, and the first phalanx of the second was 3 centimetres (1.2 in).

== Classification ==
Lü and colleagues assigned Xixiasaurus to the family Troodontidae based on its high tooth-count, constriction between the crowns and roots of the teeth, close packing of teeth near the tip of the dentary, and distinct groove for the neurovascular foramina on the dentary. They found Xixiasaurus to be most closely related to Byronosaurus of Mongolia, and suggested the two may have formed a clade with Urbacodon from Uzbekistan consisting of troodontids with unserrated teeth, which radiated across Asia (while noting that serrations had been lost independently in different groups of theropods). A 2012 phylogenetic analysis by the paleontologist Alan H. Turner and colleagues instead found Xixiasaurus to belong in a clade with Sinovenator and Mei (both also from China), due to sharing a maxillary process of the premaxilla that separated the maxilla from the nasal behind the narial opening. In 2016, the palaeontologists Alexander Averianov and Hans-Dieter Sues did not identify a clade formed of troodontids with unserrated teeth, but found them to be successive sister taxa to a more derived (or "advanced") clade of troodontids with serrated teeth. They suggested that the D-shaped cross-section of the premaxillary teeth could be one possible feature uniting Xixiasaurus, Byronosaurus, and Urbacodon.

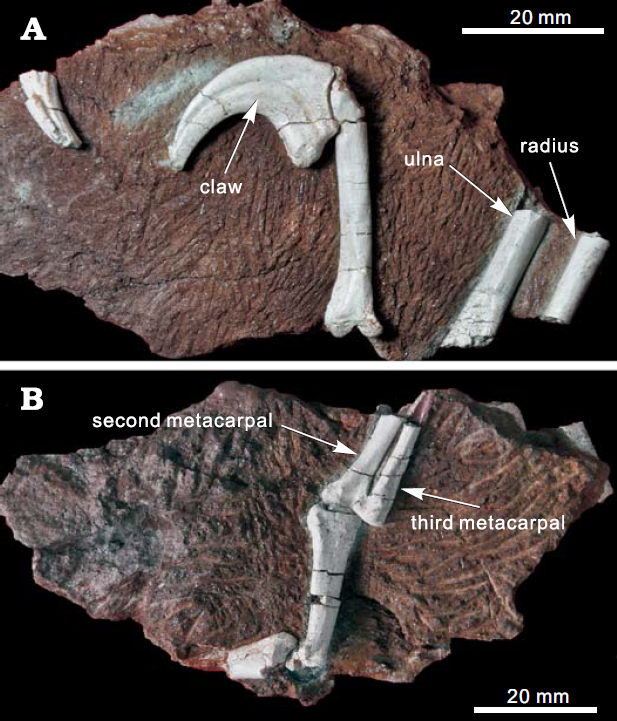
Forelimb bones of the holotype

The following cladogram shows the position of Xixiasaurus within Troodontidae according to a 2017 analysis by the palaeontologist Caizhi Shen and colleagues:

- - Troodontidae
    - MPC-D 100/44
    - Byronosaurus jaffei
    - Xixiasaurus henanensis
    - - GM 100/1323 (now Almas ukhaa)
      - - GM 100/1126
        - Jinfengopteryx elegans
    - - Mei long
      - - Sinovenator changii
        - - Daliansaurus liaoningensis
          - Sinusonasus magnodens
    - - Sinornithoides youngi
      - - Troodon formosus
        - - Zanabazar junior
          - Saurornithoides mongoliensis

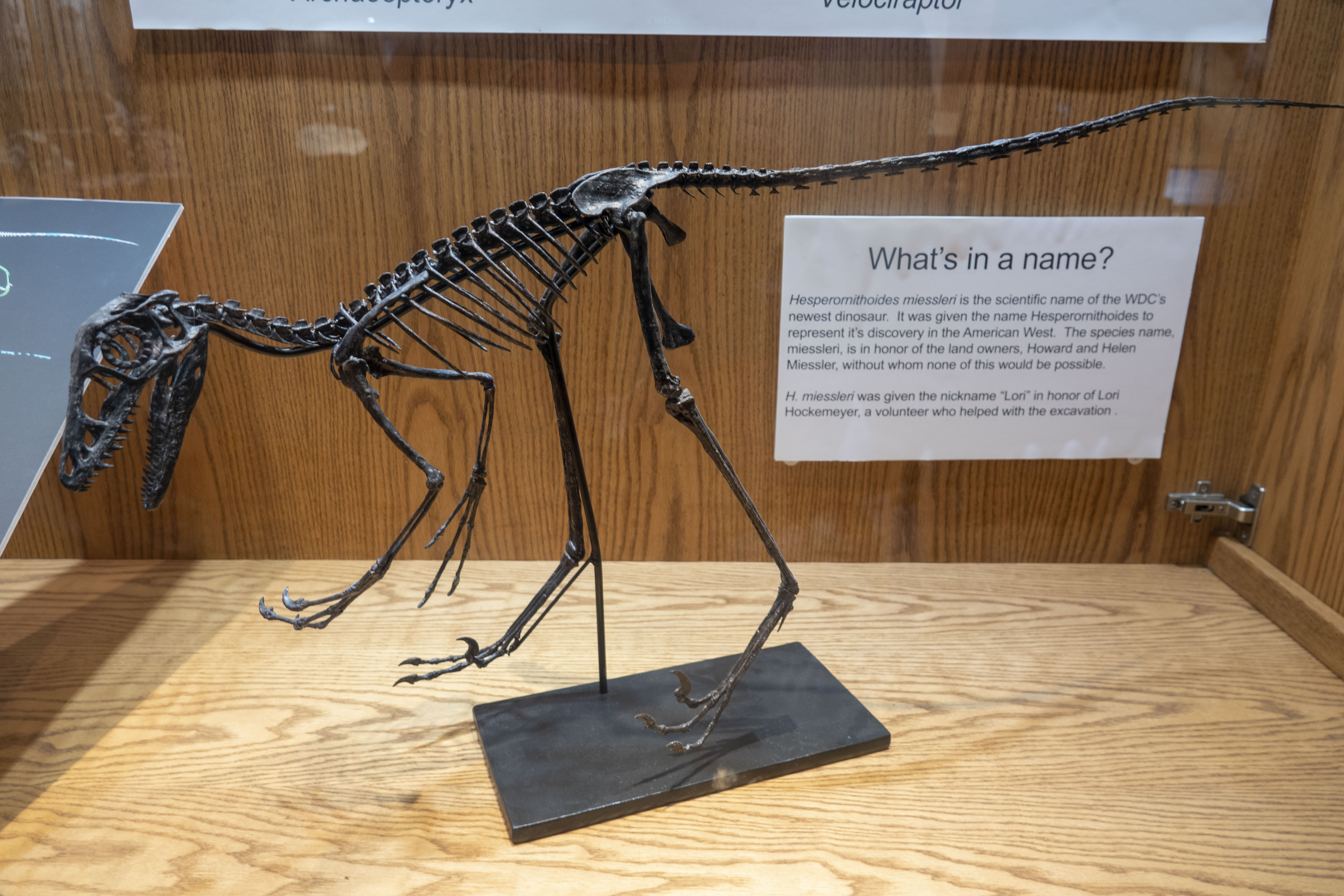
Reconstructed skeleton of Hesperornithoides, a close relative according to one study

In 2019, the palaeontologist Scott Hartman and colleagues recovered Xixiasaurus as the sister taxon of Sinusonasus, in a clade with Daliansaurus and Hesperornithoides (sharing features such as a straight ulna and having an upwards projected curve on the claw of the first finger). A 2021 study by the palaeontologists Andrea Cau and Daniel Madzia found Xixiasaurus to group with Zanabazar and Saurornithoides.

Troodontids have mainly been discovered in the Northern Hemisphere, largely restricted to Asia and North America. They appear to have reached their greatest diversity during the Campanian stage of the Late Cretaceous in Asia. Troodontids probably originated in Asia, and if genera such as Anchiornis are considered part of the family, it would have evolved by the Early Jurassic. Troodontids are grouped in the clade Paraves, along with dromaeosaurids and birds. Troodontids and dromaeosaurids have also been grouped together in the clade Deinonychosauria, based on the shared sickle-claw on their hyper-extendible second toe, but some studies have found troodontids to be more closely related to birds than to dromaeosaurids.

== Palaeobiology ==
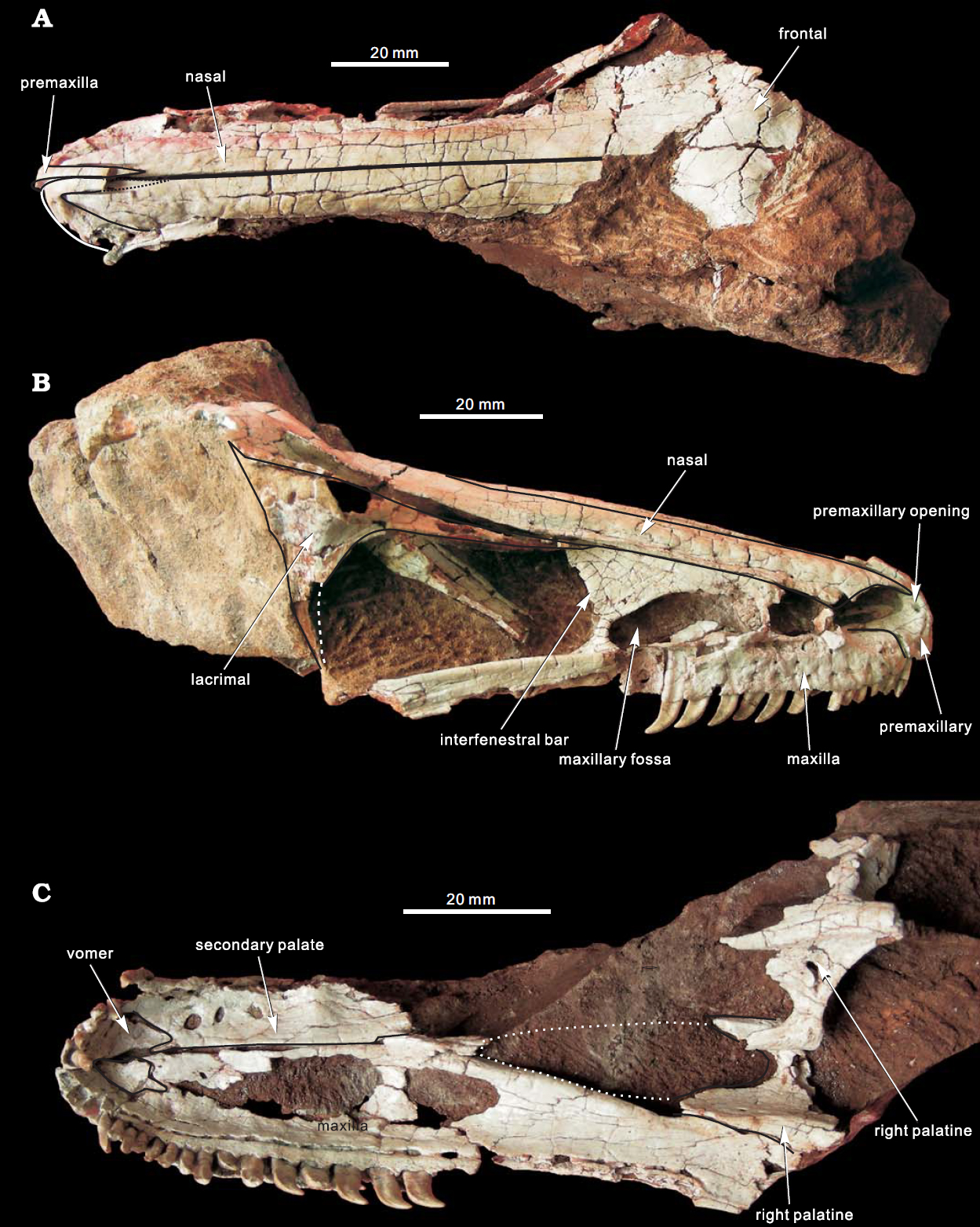
Holotype skull in multiple views, with dark lines denoting sutures, and broken white lines outlining the probable contours of missing bone

Troodontids had some of the highest encephalization quotients (a measure of the ratio between actual brain size and the brain size predicted from body size) among non-avian dinosaurs. As suggested by their large eye-sockets and well-developed middle-ears, they appear to have had keen senses. They also had proportionately long legs, which indicates they were agile. Due to their large brains, possible stereoscopic vision, grasping hands, and enlarged sickle-claws, troodontids were generally assumed to have been predatory. In 1998, the palaeontologist Thomas R. Holtz and colleagues pointed out that the serrations on the teeth of troodontids were different from those of typical, carnivorous theropods in their large size and wide spacing, which is similar to the condition in herbivorous dinosaurs (including therizinosaurid theropods) and lizards rather than carnivorous dinosaurs. They suggested that this difference in coarseness may be related to the size and resistance of plant and meat fibres, and that troodontids may have been herbivorous or omnivorous. They also pointed out that some features that had been interpreted as predatory adaptations in troodontids were also found in herbivorous and omnivorous animals, such as primates and raccoons.

In 2001, the palaeontologists Philip J. Currie and Dong Zhiming rejected the idea that troodontids could have been herbivorous. They stated that troodontid anatomy was consistent with a carnivorous lifestyle, and pointed out that the structure of their serrations was not much different from those of other theropods. They noted that troodontid features such as sharply pointed serrations that curved up towards the tip of the teeth, razor sharp enamel between the serrations, and blood grooves at the bases, were not seen in herbivorous dinosaurs, which had simpler, cone shaped serrations. Lü and colleagues discussed the previous studies of troodontid diet in 2010, and suggested that the loss of serrations in the teeth of Xixiasaurus and some other troodontids was related to a change in their diet. Since the teeth would appear to have lost their typical ability to slice meat, at least these troodontids may therefore have been either herbivorous or omnivorous. In 2015, the palaeontologist Christophe Hendrickx and colleagues suggested that basal (or "primitive") troodontids with unserrated teeth were herbivorous, whereas more derived troodontids with serrated teeth were carnivorous or omnivorous. A 2026 study by the palaeontologist Yui Chi Fan and colleagues suggested that the driving factor behind denticle loss could be to take advantage of other food sources, retaining a food source while changing to a style of hunting where disassembling prey was less necessary (such as swallowing it whole), or a reduction in the turnover of teeth and the associated energy cost. They noted troodontids are understudied, but that analysing stable isotope and elemental analysis of troodontid-bearing strata would help with understanding their diet.

== Palaeoenvironment ==
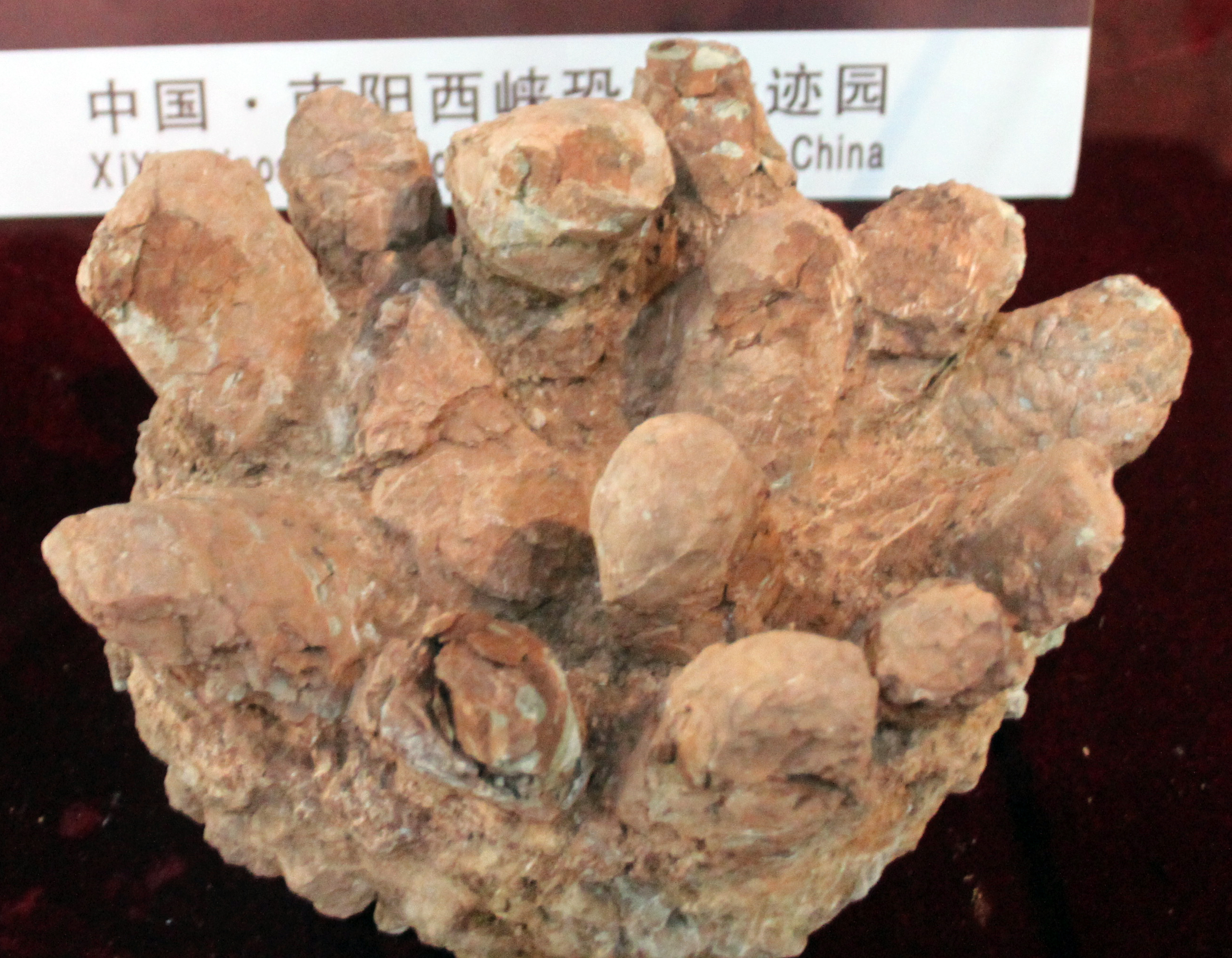
Prismatoolithus dinosaur eggs, Xixia Dinosaur Park

Xixiasaurus is known from the mid-lower part of the Majiacun Formation of China, which dates to the Late Cretaceous period, but there has been disagreement about the exact geological age of the formation. Lü and colleagues suggested the formation dated to the Campanian age, based on the similarity between Xixiasaurus and the Campanian genus Byronosaurus. A Cenomanian to Turonian age for the formation had earlier been suggested based on spores, pollen, and dinosaur eggs; a Coniacian to Santonian age has been suggested as well, and Coniacian to Campanian or Santonian to Maastrichtian ages have been suggested based on bivalve fossils. Some studies have also suggested that the formation is as old as Early Cretaceous. The Majiacun Formation is represented by an 800–1,200 metres (2,600–3,900 ft) thick layer of brown and red sandstones, with muddier intervals of purple to green, or brown to red. The lower and middle units of the formation are composed of sandstone, siltstone, and mudstone. Eggs and eggshells are often found in the muddy siltstones.

The formations of the Xixia Basin are thought to be of continental origin (due to the absence of marine fossils), probably deposited by rivers and within lakes. The Majiacun Formation itself is interpreted as representing deposits of braided streams and meandering streams. The formation was part of the Yunmeng Lake drainage system during the Late Cretaceous. The palaeoclimate of the Xixia basin is inferred to have been subtropical, sub-humid to sub-arid, based on the preponderance of C3 plants identified in the diet of the dinosaurs there (determined through isotopic study of egg shells). Other dinosaurs from the formation include the alvarezsaurid Xixianykus, the hadrosauroid Zhanghenglong, an unnamed spinosaurid, ankylosaurid, and sauropods. The discovery of abundant and diverse dinosaur eggs in Henan Province has been considered "one of the significant scientific events" in China. Dinosaur ootaxa (taxa based on eggs) from the Majiacun Formation include Prismatoolithus (which may belong to troodontids), Ovaloolithus, Paraspheroolithus, Placoolithus, Dendroolithus, Youngoolithus, and Nanhiungoolithus. Reptiles include turtles and crocodilians. Invertebrates include the bivalves Plicatounio and Sphaerium and the clam shrimp Tylestheria (invertebrate trace fossils are also known). Spores of plants such as Schizaeoisporites, Cicatruicosisporites, Lygodiumsporites, Cyathidites, Osmundacidites, and Pagiophyllumpollenites have also been identified.

== See also ==
- Timeline of troodontid research
