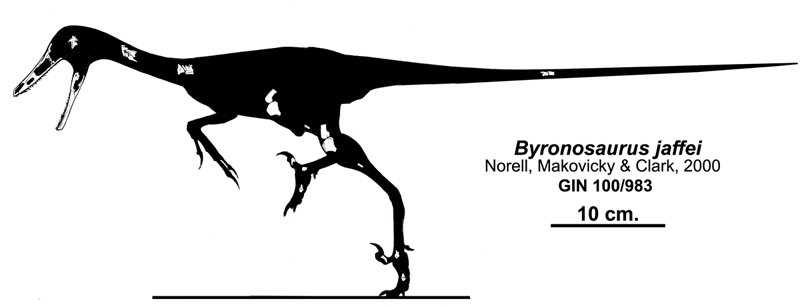
- Diagram showing known remains

Scientific classification
- Kingdom: Animalia
- Phylum: Chordata
- Class: Reptilia
- Clade: Dinosauria
- Clade: Saurischia
- Clade: Theropoda
- Family: †Troodontidae
- Subfamily: †Troodontinae
- Genus: †Byronosaurus; Norell, Makovicky & Clark, 2000
- Species: †B. jaffei

Binomial name
- †Byronosaurus jaffei Norell, Makovicky & Clark, 2000

= Byronosaurus =

Byronosaurus Temporal range: Late Cretaceous, 80–71 Ma

Extinct genus of dinosaurs

Byronosaurus is a genus of troodontid dinosaur from the Late Cretaceous Period of Mongolia.

== Discovery and naming ==
In 1993, Michael Novacek, a member of an American Museum of Natural History expedition to the Gobi Desert, discovered the skeleton of a small theropod at Ukhaa Tolgod. This was further excavated in 1994 and 1995. The find was illustrated in a publication in 1994. On 15 July 1996, at the Bolor's Hill site, about eight kilometers (five miles) away from the original location, a second specimen was discovered, a skull.

In 2000, Mark Norell, Peter Makovicky and James Clark named and described the type species Byronosaurus jaffei. The species name as a whole honoured Byron Jaffe, "in recognition of his family's support for the Mongolian Academy of Sciences-American Museum of Natural History Paleontological Expeditions".

The holotype, IGM 100/983, was found in a layer of the Djadochta Formation dating from the late Campanian. It consists of a partial skeleton with skull. It contains a partial skull with lower jaws, three neck vertebrae, three back vertebrae, a piece of a sacral vertebra, four partial tail vertebrae, ribs, the lower end of a thighbone, the upper ends of a shinbone and calf bone, a second metatarsal and three toe phalanges. The paratype, specimen IGM 100/984, is the skull found in 1996, of which only the snout has been preserved. Both specimens are of adult individuals.

In 2003, the type specimen of Byronosaurus was described in detail. Makovicky and his colleagues found that Byronosaurus had a pneumatised snout with a sinus in each maxilla.

In 2009, two front skulls and lower jaws of very young, perhaps newly hatched, individuals, specimens IGM 100/972 and IGM 100/974, were referred to Byronosaurus, after originally having been identified as Velociraptor exemplars. Bever and Norell estimated that the skull length of IGM 100/972 and IGM 100/974 were about 22.6 cm (8.9 in) and 25.4 cm (10.0 in), respectively.

In 2017, the researchers who described a troodontid Almas ukhaa suggested that the specimens described by Bever and Norell (2009) don't belong to Byronosaurus based on different features found in the skull such as the number of maxillary teeth in both specimens being significantly fewer than this genus. They argued that these specimens are more closely related to A. ukhaa than to B. jaffei.

== Description ==
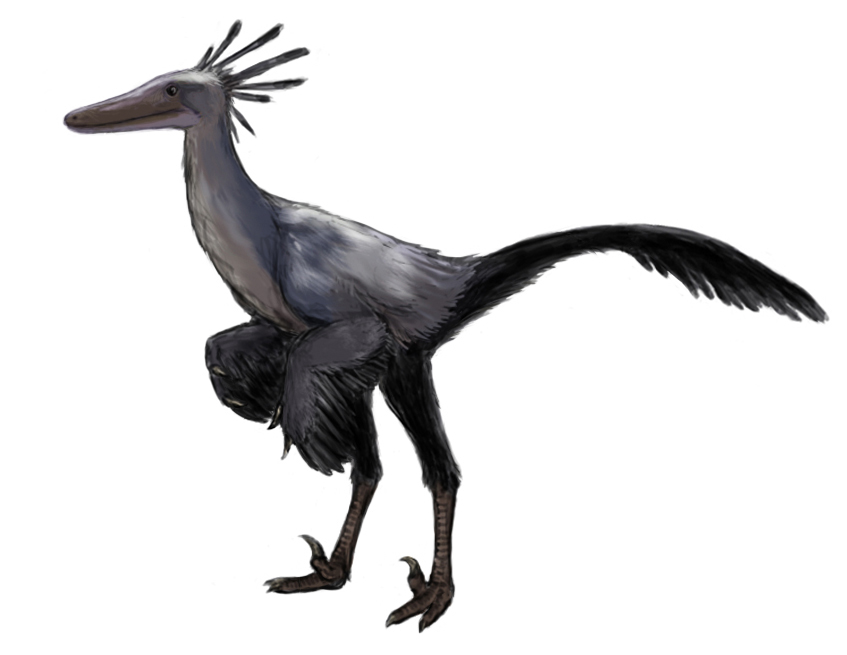
Life restoration

Byronosaurus was a small dinosaur, measuring about 1.5–2 m (4.9–6.6 ft) long and 50 cm (20 in) tall; it weighed only about 4–20 kg (8.8–44.1 lb). Unlike most other troodontids, its teeth seem to lack serrations just like its closest relative Xixiasaurus, probably a plesiomorphic trait among troodontids. The Ukhaa perinates show that Byronosaurus had a buccal maxillary groove and a recessed interfenestral bar.

== Classification ==
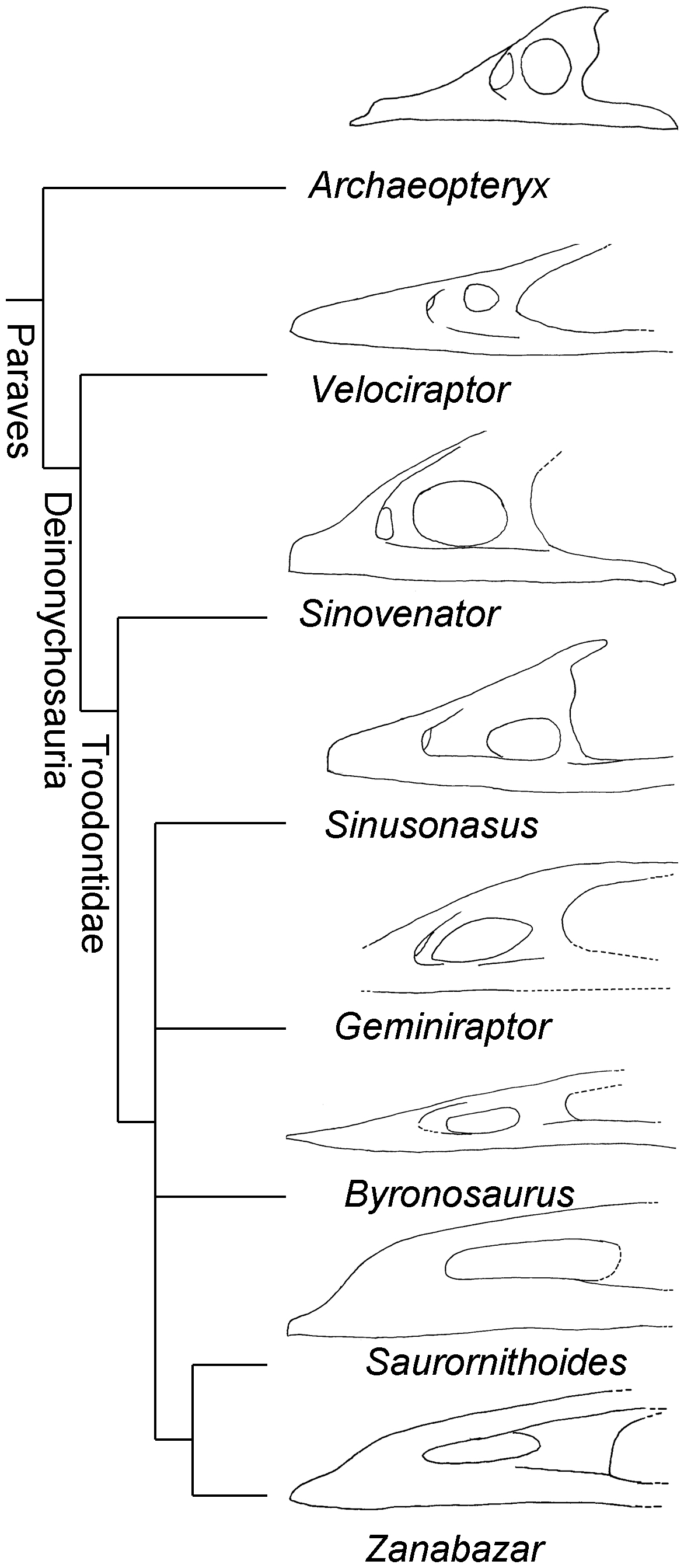
Maxillae of Byronosaurus compared with relatives

The following cladogram shows the position of Byronosaurus within Troodontidae according to a 2017 analysis by the palaeontologist Caizhi Shen and colleagues:

- - MPC-D 100/44
  - Byronosaurus jaffei
  - Xixiasaurus henanensis
  - - GM 100/1323 (now Almas ukhaa)
    - - GM 100/1126
      - Jinfengopteryx elegans
  - - Mei long
    - - Sinovenator changii
      - - Daliansaurus liaoningensis
        - Sinusonasus magnodens
  - - Sinornithoides youngi
    - - Troodon formosus
      - - Zanabazar junior
        - Saurornithoides mongoliensis

== Palaeobiology ==
Troodontids had some of the highest encephalization quotients (a measure of the ratio between actual brain size and the brain size predicted from body size) among non-avian dinosaurs. As suggested by their large eye-sockets and well-developed middle-ears, they appear to have had keen senses. They also had proportionately long legs, which indicates they were agile.

=== Diet ===
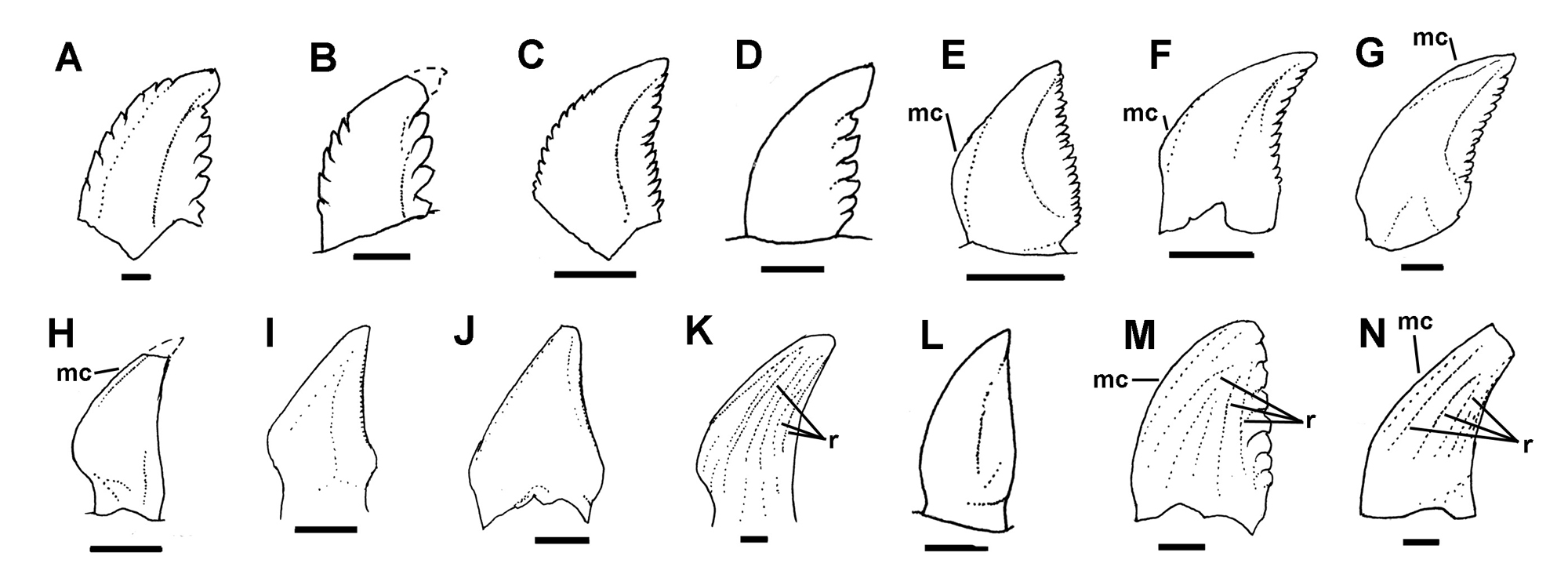
Comparison of troodontid teeth; L is Byronosaurus

Due to their large brains, possible stereoscopic vision, grasping hands, and enlarged sickle-claws, troodontids were generally assumed to have been predatory. In 1998, the palaeontologist Thomas R. Holtz and colleagues pointed out that the serrations on the teeth of troodontids were different from those of typical, carnivorous theropods in their large size and wide spacing, which is similar to the condition in herbivorous dinosaurs (including therizinosaurid theropods) and lizards rather than carnivorous dinosaurs. They suggested that this difference in coarseness may be related to the size and resistance of plant and meat fibres, and that troodontids may have been herbivorous or omnivorous. They also pointed out that some features that had been interpreted as predatory adaptations in troodontids were also found in herbivorous and omnivorous animals, such as primates and raccoons.

In 2001, the palaeontologists Philip J. Currie and Dong Zhiming rejected the idea that troodontids could have been herbivorous. They stated that troodontid anatomy was consistent with a carnivorous lifestyle, and pointed out that the structure of their serrations was not much different from those of other theropods. They noted that troodontid features such as sharply pointed serrations that curved up towards the tip of the teeth, razor sharp enamel between the serrations, and blood grooves at the bases, were not seen in herbivorous dinosaurs, which had simpler, cone shaped serrations. Lü and colleagues discussed the previous studies of troodontid diet, and suggested that the loss of serrations in the teeth of Byronosaurus and some other troodontids was related to a change in their diet. Since the teeth would appear to have lost their typical ability to slice meat, at least these troodontids may therefore have been either herbivorous or omnivorous. In 2015, the palaeontologist Christophe Hendrickx and colleagues suggested that basal (or "primitive") troodontids with unserrated teeth were herbivorous, whereas more derived troodontids with serrated teeth were carnivorous or omnivorous.

=== Reproduction ===
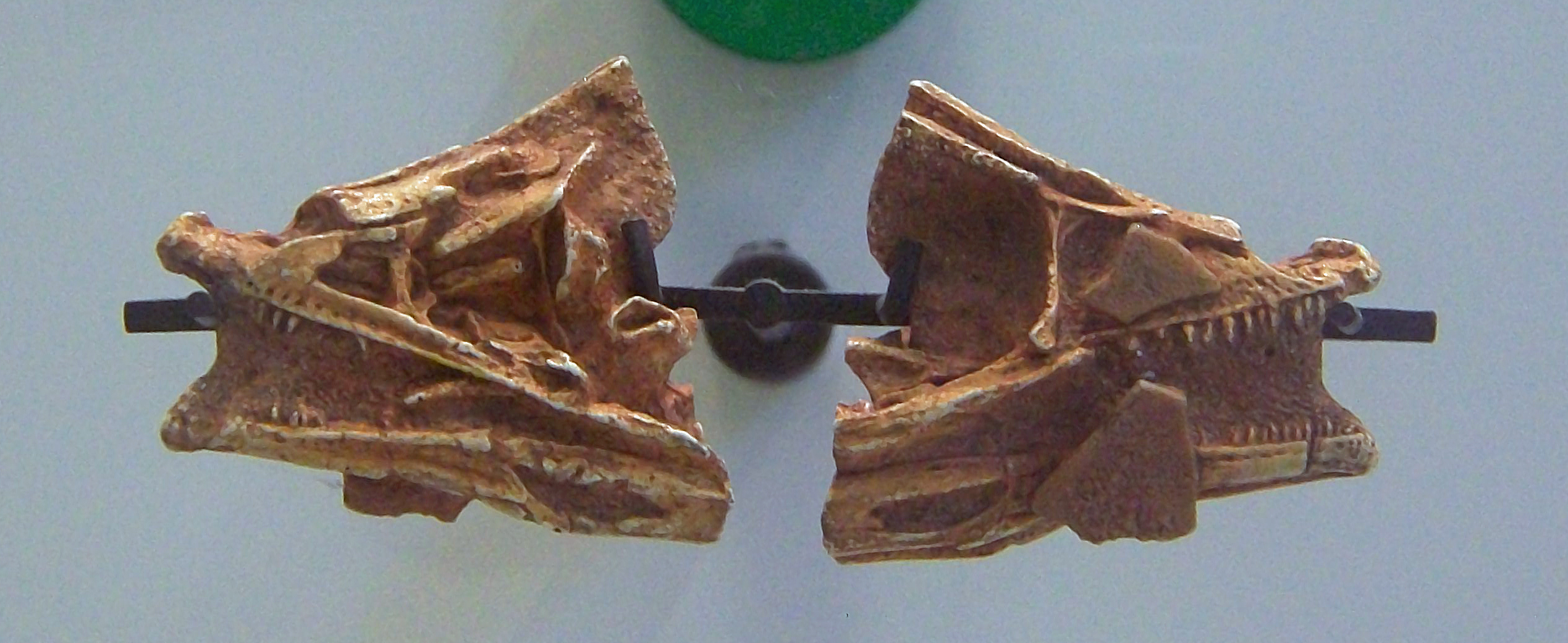
Hatchling specimen IGM 100/972 at the AMNH

Mark Norell and colleagues described two "perinate" (hatchlings or embryos close to hatching) specimens of Byronosaurus (specimens IGM 100/972 and IGM 100/974) in 1994. The two specimens were found in a nest of oviraptorid eggs in the Late Cretaceous "Flaming Cliffs" of the Djadochta Formation of Mongolia. The nest is quite certainly that of an oviraptorosaur, since an oviraptorid embryo is still preserved inside one of the eggs. The two partial skulls were first described by Norell et al. (1994) as dromaeosaurids, but reassigned to Byronosaurus after further study. The juvenile skulls were either from hatchlings or embryos, and fragments of eggshell are adhered to them although it seems to be oviraptorid eggshell.

The presence of tiny Byronosaurus skulls in an oviraptorid nest was considered an enigma. Hypotheses explaining how they came to be there included that they were the prey of the adult oviraptorid, that they were there to prey on oviraptorid hatchlings, or that an adult Byronosaurus may have laid eggs in a Citipati nest (see nest parasite). However, these interpretations have all been shown to not be the case. In 2011, Norell stated that the Byronosaurus nest was found two metres uphill from the oviraptorid nest, with the oviraptorid nest at the end of a drainage course from the Byronosaurus nest, suggesting that the baby Byronosaurus skulls must have been washed from one nest to the other. This claim has been already confirmed in 2005 by Gerald Grellet-Tinner who noted the presence of a troodontid nest (IGM 100/1003x) close to the Citipati nest containing the juvenile troodontid skulls. Norell is officially preparing to publish this information with more important details.

Not only is the claim regarding nest parasitism considered dubious, but other researchers have pointed out the differences in skull morphology, suggesting that these specimens do not belong to this genus. The eggs of Byronosaurus and other troodontids are not paired unlike oviraptorids like Citipati, but are "nearly vertically embedded with their round poles" up and are exposed barely above the sediment.

== See also ==
- Timeline of troodontid research
