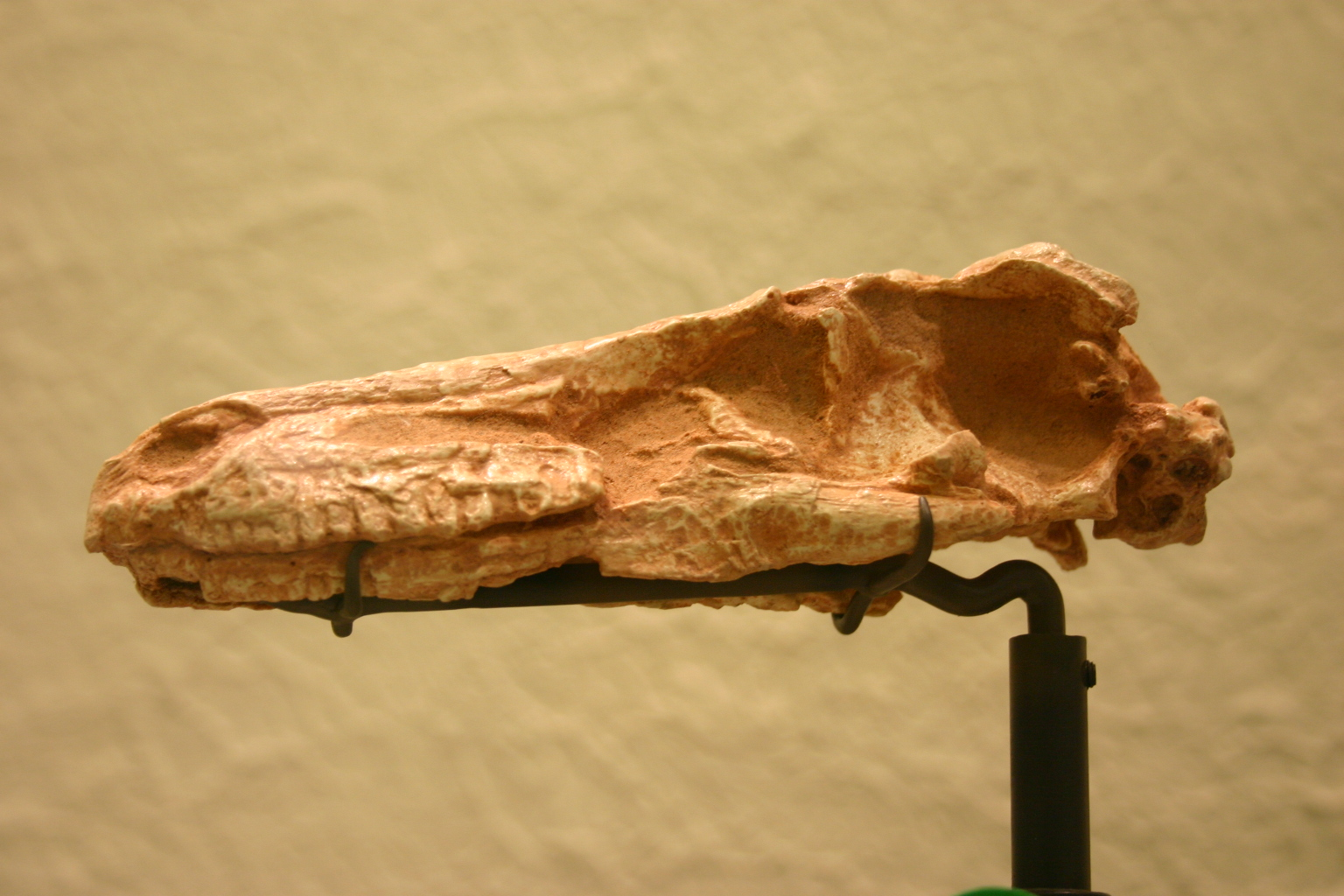
- Holotype skull, AMNH 6516

Scientific classification
- Kingdom: Animalia
- Phylum: Chordata
- Class: Reptilia
- Clade: Dinosauria
- Clade: Saurischia
- Clade: Theropoda
- Family: †Troodontidae
- Subfamily: †Troodontinae
- Genus: †Saurornithoides; Osborn, 1924
- Species: †S. mongoliensis

Binomial name
- †Saurornithoides mongoliensis Osborn, 1924

Synonyms
- Troodon mongoliensis Paul, 1988

= Saurornithoides =

Saurornithoides Temporal range: Late Cretaceous 75 Ma

Extinct genus of dinosaurs

Saurornithoides (/sɔːˌrɔːrnɪˈθɔɪdiːz/ saw-ROR-ni-THOY-deez) is a genus of troodontid maniraptoran dinosaur, which lived during the Late Cretaceous period. These creatures were predators, which could run fast on their hind legs and had excellent sight and hearing. The name is derived from the Greek stems saur~ (lizard), ornith~ (bird) and eides (form), referring to its bird-like skull.

== History of discovery ==
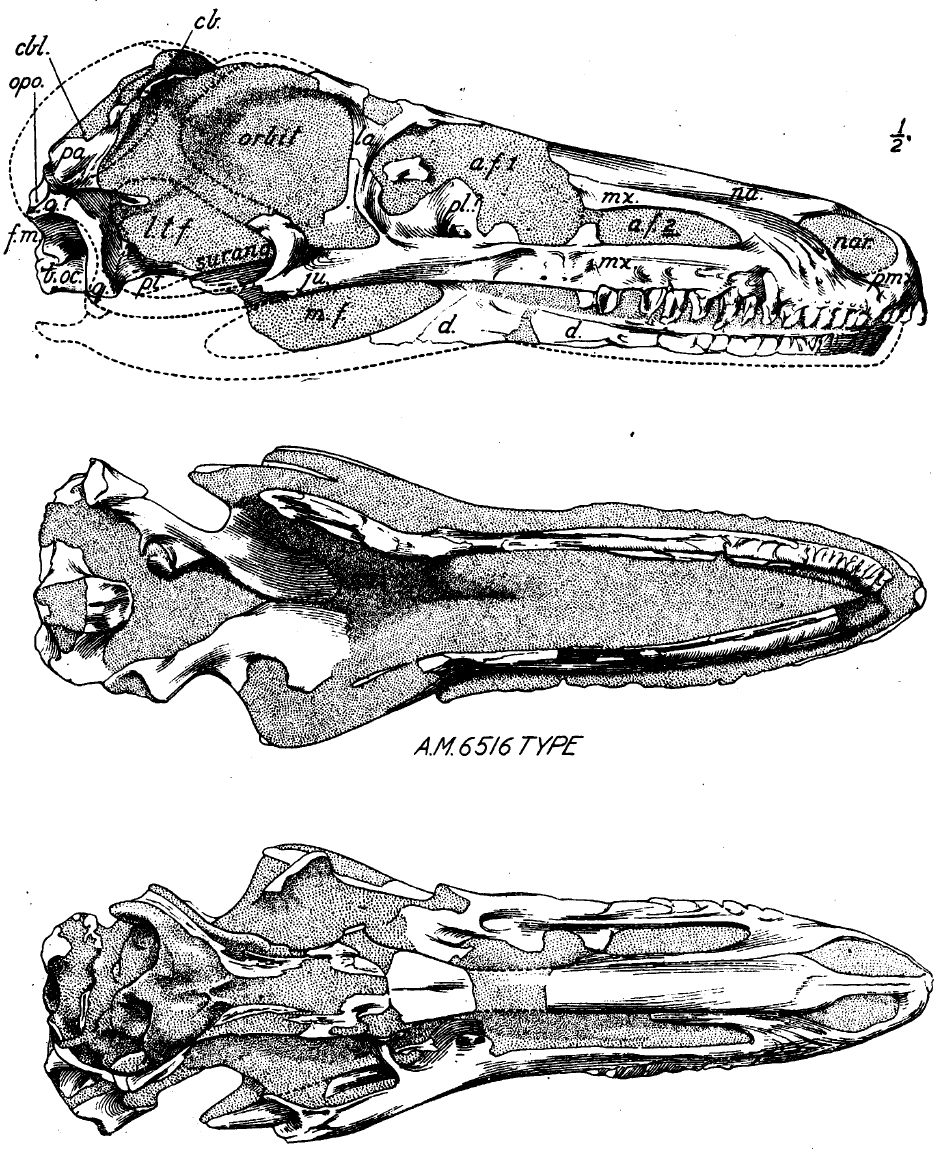
Holotype skull seen from the right, below, and above

Originally, only one or possibly two individuals of Saurornithoides were known, closely associated within the same layer of the Djadochta Formation of Mongolia. The fossils were found on 9 July 1923 by a Chinese employee of an American Museum of Natural History expedition, Chih. The material contained a single skull and jaw in association, and vertebrae, a partial pelvis, hindlimb and foot associated nearby. More bones were initially included but later shown to belong to Protoceratops. Henry Fairfield Osborn at first intended to name the animal "Ornithoides", the "bird-like one", and in 1924 mentioned this name in a popular publication but without a description so that it remained an invalid nomen nudum. He then formally described the remains in the same year, finding them to be a new genus and species, which he named Saurornithoides mongoliensis. The generic name was chosen because of the bird-like bones of the taxon, which was thought to represent a megalosaurian, translating as "saurian with bird-like rostrum". Saurornithoides was noted to resemble Velociraptor, although more sluggish according to Osborn. The holotype specimen is AMNH 6516. This specimen was the first troodontid skeleton found, though at the time the connection with Troodon, then known only from its teeth, was not realised.

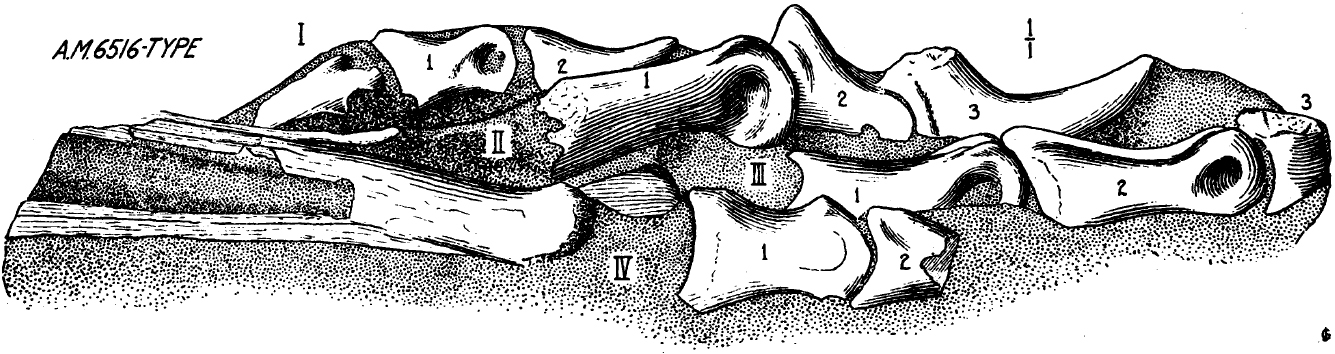
Left foot of the type specimen as seen from the inside

In 1964, another specimen was described from the Late Cretaceous of Mongolia. The first specimen ever collected by a professional Mongolian palaeontologist, it was given the specimen number IGM 100/1. In 1974, it was described by Rinchen Barsbold as a new species, Saurornithoides junior. It was assigned to the genus based on cranial comparisons, as well as the similar provincialism. However, since the description, many more troodontids have been described with cranial material, and as such, a 2009 study on Saurornithoides reassigned this species to its own genus, Zanabazar.

In 1993, a juvenile specimen of S. mongoliensis was described. The highly ossified hindlimb suggested that Saurornithoides and other troodontids were well developed at birth and that they probably required little to no parental care.

Several other Saurornithoides species were named, though none of these is today seen as valid. In 1928, baron Franz Nopcsa coined Saurornithoides sauvagei. However, this was the result of a printing error: he had planned to name a Teinurosaurus sauvagei. In 1982, Kenneth Carpenter renamed Stenonychosaurus inequalis Sternberg 1932 into Saurornithoides inequalis. Today this is usually seen as a junior synonym of Troodon formosus. In 1991, George Olshevsky renamed Pectinodon asiamericanus Nesov 1985 into Saurornithoides asiamericanus. In 1995 he made it a Troodon asiaamericanus. In view of its provenance from the Cenomanian of Uzbekistan, it is usually seen as a different taxon from Saurornithoides. In 2000, Olshevsky renamed Troodon isfarensis Nessov 1995 into Saurornithoides isfarensis. In 2007, this was shown to have been a hadrosaurid fossil.

== Description ==
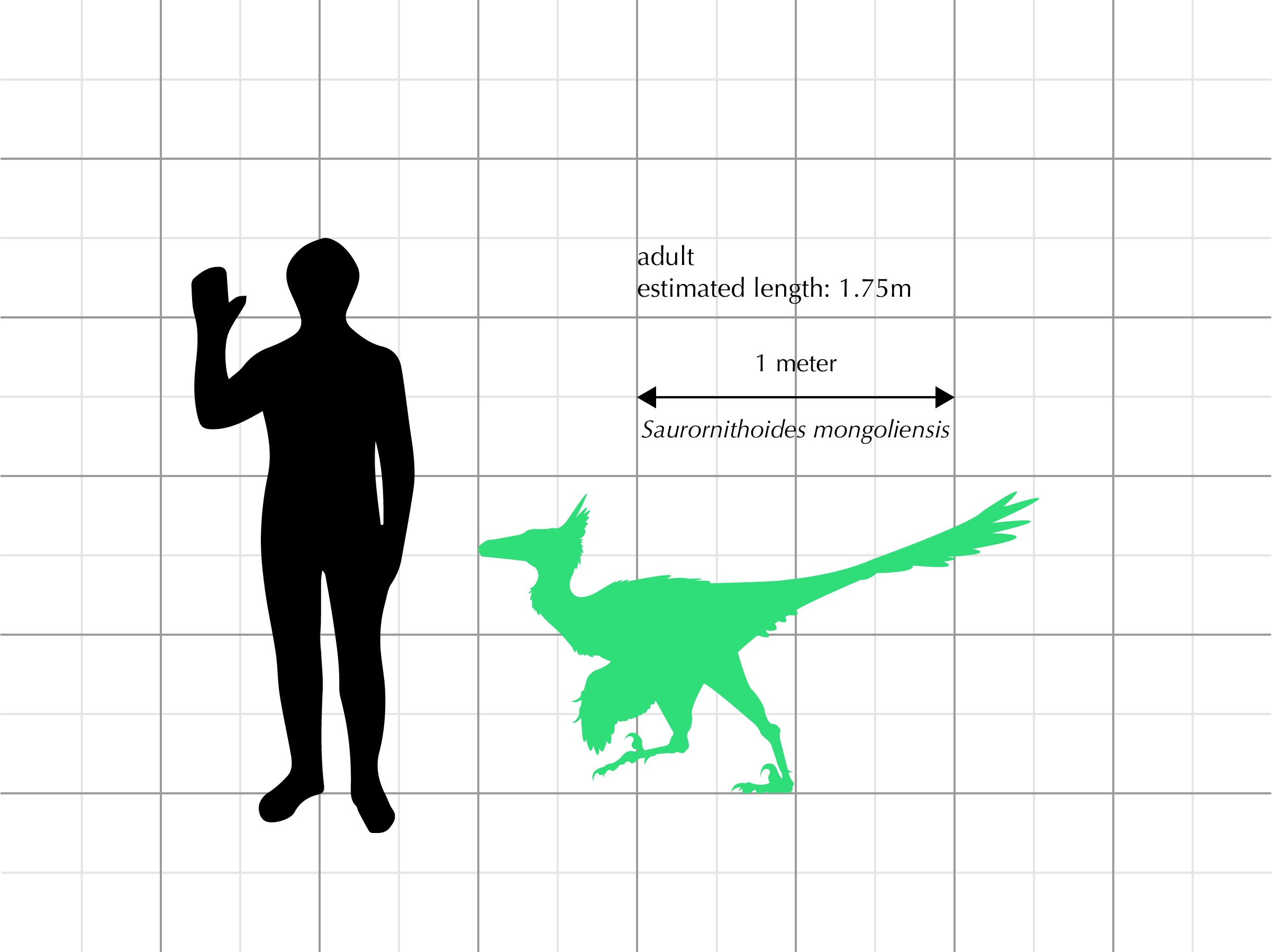
Size compared to a human

Saurornithoides is a member of the troodontids, a group of small, bird-like, gracile maniraptorans. All troodontids have many unique features of the skull, such as closely spaced teeth in the lower jaw, and large numbers of teeth. Troodontids have sickle-claws and raptorial hands, and some of the highest non-avian encephalization quotients, meaning they were behaviourally advanced and had keen senses. Saurornithoides was a rather small troodontid. Though a possible adult, the type specimen has a midline skull length of 189 millimetres, compared to 272 millimetres for Zanabazar junior, itself estimated at 2.3 meters long. It had large eye sockets and stereoscopic vision, allowing for good depth perception. It probably had good vision in light and very good night vision. It had a long, low head, a depressed muzzle, sharp teeth and a relatively large brain. Swift and smart, like its North American cousin Troodon, Saurornithoides probably scoured the Gobi Desert, looking for small mammals or reptiles to eat. Like other troodontids, it had an enlarged retractable claw on the second toe of each foot, that in this case was of moderate size though rather curved.

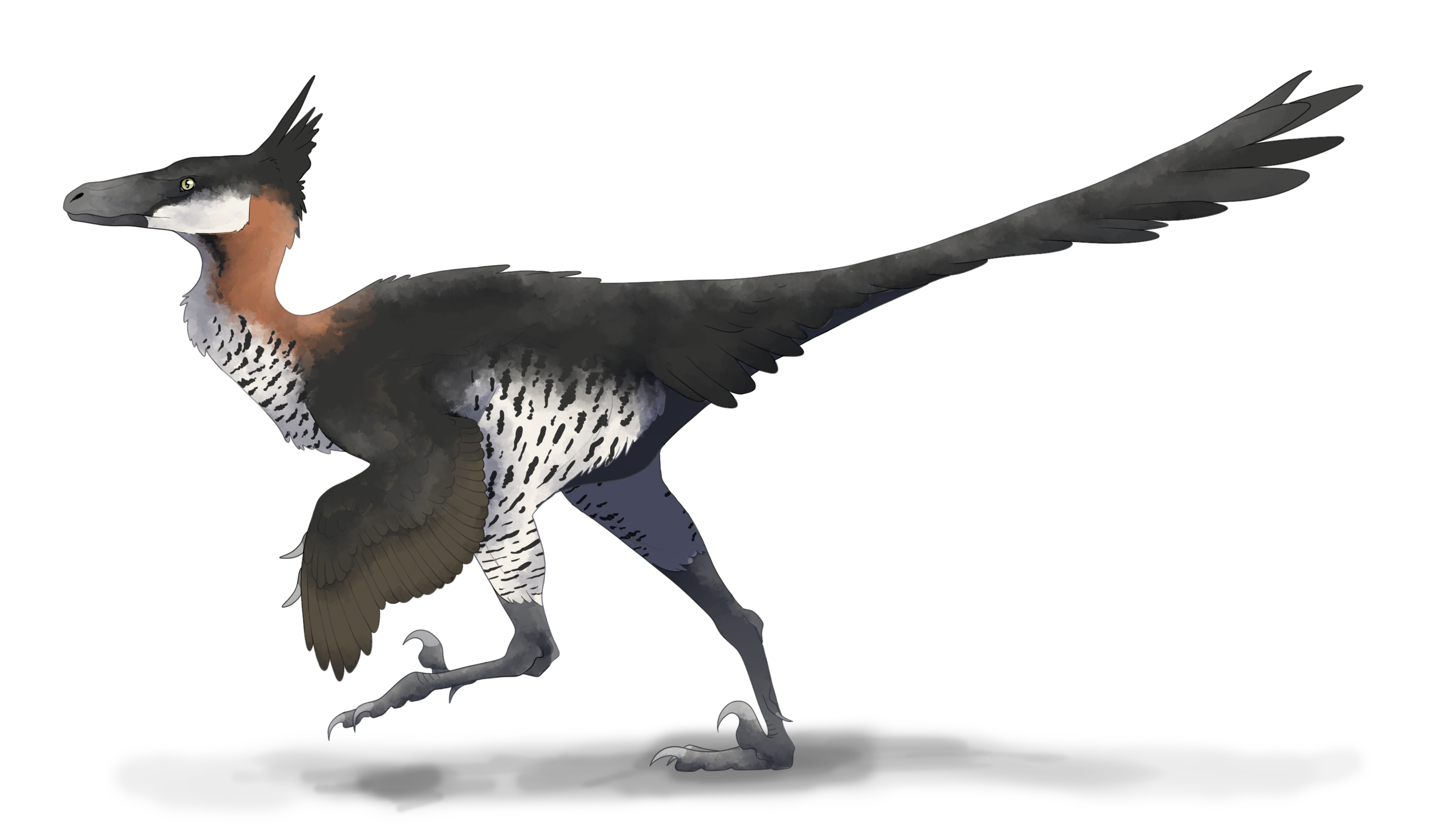
Life restoration of Saurornithoides.

A juvenile specimen of S. mongoliensis was described in 1993 and gave insights into the life history of the species as well as its relatives; the highly ossified hindlimb suggested that Saurornithoides and other troodontids were well developed at birth and that they probably required little to no parental care.

A revision of the genus in 2009 provided a differential diagnosis, a list of traits in which Saurornithoides differed from certain relevant relatives, especially concentrating on determining its place in the evolutionary tree. That Saurornithoides mongoliensis might be more derived, higher in the tree, than Sinornithoides and Sinusonasus, is indicated by the lack of a fenestra promaxillaris, a small opening at the front side of the snout, and the possession of large denticles on the rear tooth edges as well as the presence of the high number of six sacral vertebrae. That S. mongoliensis might be more basal, lower in the tree, than Zanabazar and Troodon, is shown by the presence of a recessus tympanicus dorsalis, the upper one of three small openings on the side of the braincase, in the inner ear region.

== Classification ==
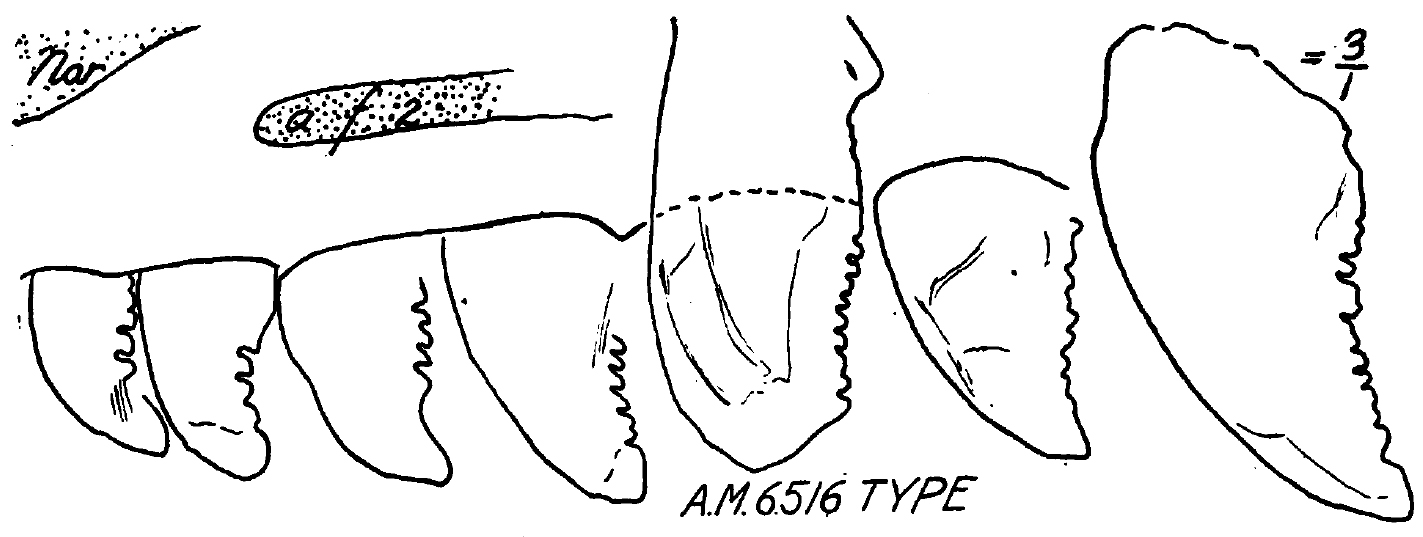
Maxillary teeth

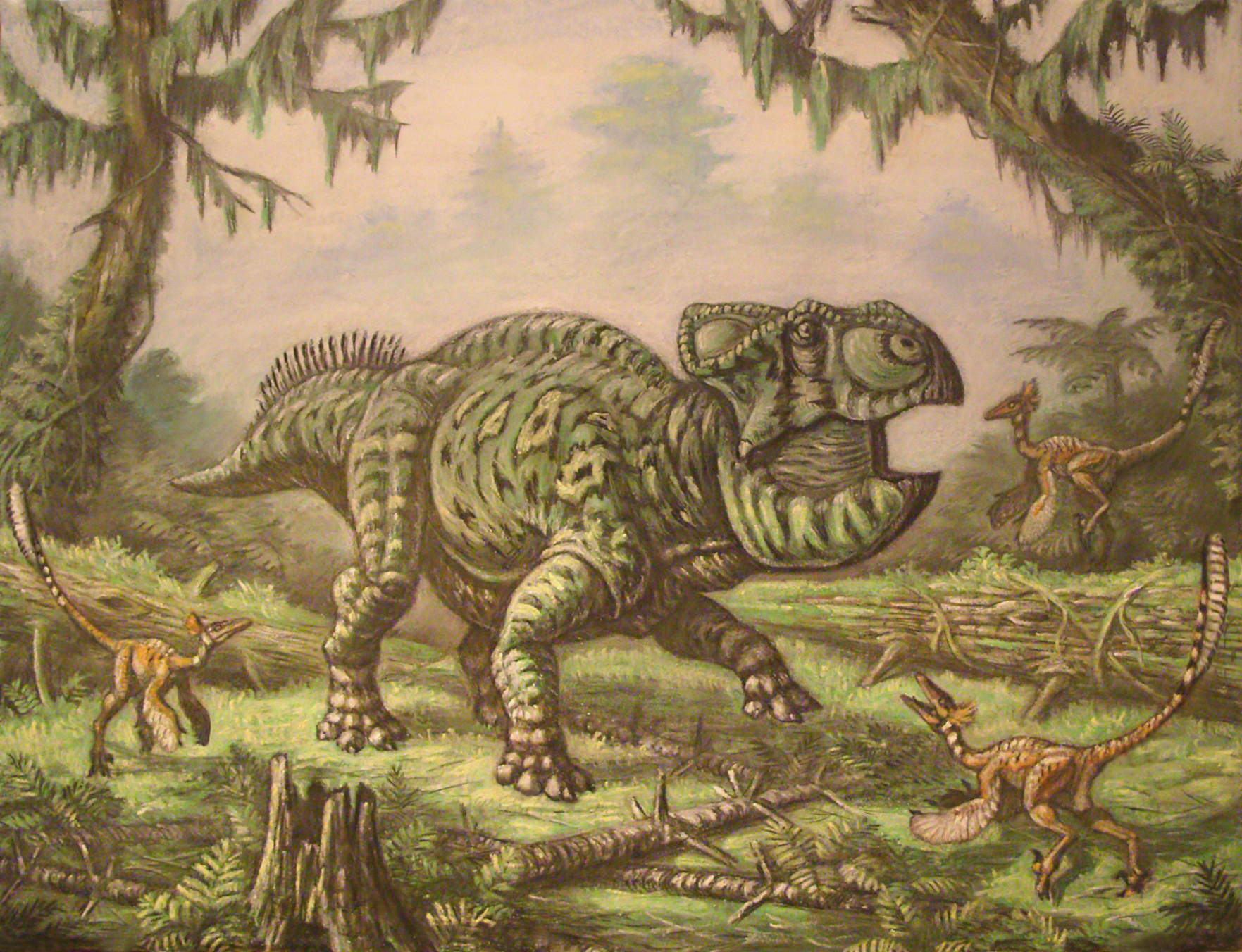
Saurornithoides group surrounding an Udanoceratops

Osborn at first placed Saurornithoides in the Megalosauridae, noticing the resemblance to Velociraptor, named in the same paper. Only in 1974, Barsbold, while describing S. junior, understood the connection with American forms such as Stenonychosaurus and named an encompassing Saurornithoididae. In 1987, Philip John Currie showed that this concept was a junior synonym of Troodontidae, implying that Saurornithoides were a troodontid too.

The cladogram below follows a 2012 analysis by Turner, Makovicky and Norell.

- Paraves
  - Epidexipteryx
  - - Avialae
    - Deinonychosauria
      - Dromaeosauridae
      - Troodontidae
        - - Anchiornis
          - Xiaotingia
        - - Jinfengopteryginae
            - IGM 100/1323 (Almas)
            - - IGM 100/1126
              - Jinfengopteryx
          - - - Mei
              - - Sinovenator
                - Xixiasaurus
            - - IGM 100/44
              - - Byronosaurus
                - - Sinornithoides
                  - - Troodon
                    - - Saurornithoides
                      - Zanabazar

== See also ==
- Timeline of troodontid research
