= Polyodontosaurus =

Polyodontosaurus Temporal range: Campanian, 75.5 Ma

Scientific classification
- Kingdom: Animalia
- Phylum: Chordata
- Class: Reptilia
- Clade: Dinosauria
- Clade: Saurischia
- Clade: Theropoda
- Family: †Troodontidae
- Genus: †Polyodontosaurus; Gilmore, 1932
- Species: †P. grandis

Binomial name
- †Polyodontosaurus grandis Gilmore, 1932

Synonyms
- Polydontosaurus van der Reest & Currie, 2017 (sic)

Genus of troodontid dinosaur from the Late Cretaceous period

Polyodontosaurus (meaning "many-toothed lizard") is a potentially dubious genus of troodontid dinosaur named in 1932 by Charles W. Gilmore for a left dentary from the Dinosaur Park Formation. It had been considered a synonym of Stenonychosaurus or Troodon for a significant time, before being declared a nomen dubium. The only known species is the type, P. grandis.

== History of discovery ==
The holotype and only known specimen of Polyodontosaurus was collected in 1928 by Charles Mortram Sternberg, and includes only a left dentary, lacking any teeth. Sternberg presented the dentary to Charles Gilmore, who identified it as a lizard. Gilmore thus named the binomial Polyodontosaurus grandis for the new taxon in 1932. Sternberg revisited the material in 1951 and determined that it represented a carnivorous dinosaur based on the general morphology of the bone, as well as the anatomy of the Meckelian groove, multiple nutrient foramina, and separation of teeth into multiple sockets. Sternberg compared this dentary to one referred to Troodon by Russel in 1948, and decided that they belonged to the same family, and potentially the same genus. While similar, there were a few differences, that might be shown to relate to age or variation within the genus. Sternberg, therefore, referred Polyodontosaurus to the family Troodontidae, until further material could be found. The name Polyodontosaurus has been misspelled as "Polydontosaurus" by some authors.

Polyodontosaurus, represented by the holotype CMN 8540, was found in the Steveville area in the Dinosaur Park Formation. It was found about 37 m (121 ft) below the highest layer of the formation, and comes from the MAZ (Megaherbivore assemblage zone)-2 portion of the fauna, which existed after MAZ-1. This exact stratigraphic location cannot be verified. MAZ-2 spans from 75.9 to 75.3 million years ago, CMN 8540 is from slightly above (younger) than the middle of the formation.

In 1969 Dale Russell described a new specimen of Stenonychosaurus, a troodontid closely related to Saurornithoides. This specimen, CMN 12340, was from the Oldman Formation of Alberta, which lies directly above the Dinosaur Park Formation. This specimen was later named Latenivenatrix and comes from the MAZ-2 level of the formation. Because of the similarities between Polyodontosaurus, Stenonychosaurus, and more complete Saurornithoides, Russell concluded that Polyodontosaurus was a junior synonym of Stenonychosaurus, and that they both might be synonyms of the tooth-taxon Troodon, although the material of Troodon is very incomplete.

== Classification ==
After being initially named as a lizard, Polydontosaurus was reclassified as a troodontid, a classification which stands today. Since 1969 Polyodontosaurus has been considered a synonym of Stenonychosaurus, and later its senior synonym Troodon. Polyodontosaurus is potentially a synonym of the taxon Latenivenatrix, named in 2017, but they may come from separate regions of the formation. Van der Reest & Currie in 2017 determined that due to the lack of sufficient material in the holotype, and that the dentaries of troodontids to not bear unique, autapomorphic features, Polyodontosaurus was a nomen dubium, and could not be considered senior synonym of Latenivenatrix.

Below is the phylogenetic analysis of van der Reest & Currie (2017). Polyodontosaurus has been considered a synonym of the "Two Medicine troodontid" and Latenivenatrix previously.

- Troodontidae
  - Sinovenator
  - - Anchiornis
    - - Mei
      - Talos
      - - Byronosaurus
        - - MPC-D 100/44
          - Sinornithoides
          - Troodontinae
            - - Urbacodon
              - Gobivenator
            - - - Latenivenatrix
                - - Philovenator
                  - Linhevenator
              - - Two medicine troodontid
                - - Saurornithoides
                  - Zanabazar

== Paleoecology ==
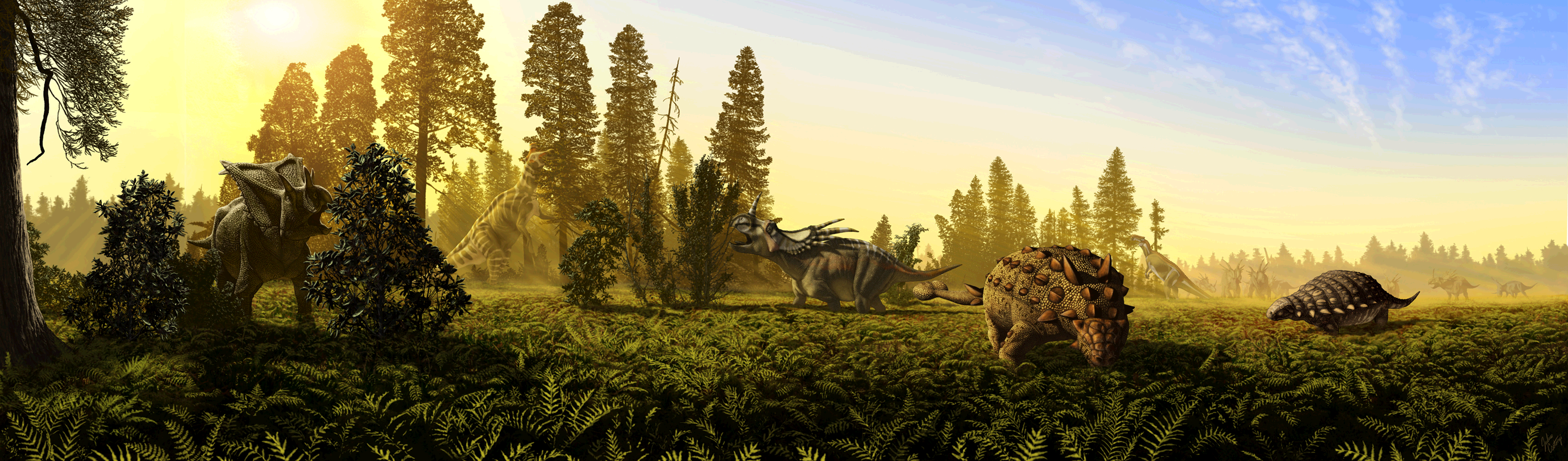
Megafaunal dinosaurs of the Dinosaur Park Formation

The single specimen of Polyodontosaurus was found in the central level of the Dinosaur Park Formation, and was a member of a diverse and well-documented fauna of prehistoric animals that included such well-known dinosaurs as the horned Centrosaurus, Styracosaurus, and Chasmosaurus, fellow duckbills Prosaurolophus, Gryposaurus, Corythosaurus, and Parasaurolophus, tyrannosaurid Gorgosaurus, and armored Edmontonia and Euoplocephalus. The Dinosaur Park Formation is interpreted as a low-relief setting of rivers and floodplains that became more swampy and influenced by marine conditions over time as the Western Interior Seaway transgressed westward. The climate was warmer than present-day Alberta, without frost, but with wetter and drier seasons. Conifers were apparently the dominant canopy plants, with an understory of ferns, tree ferns, and angiosperms.
