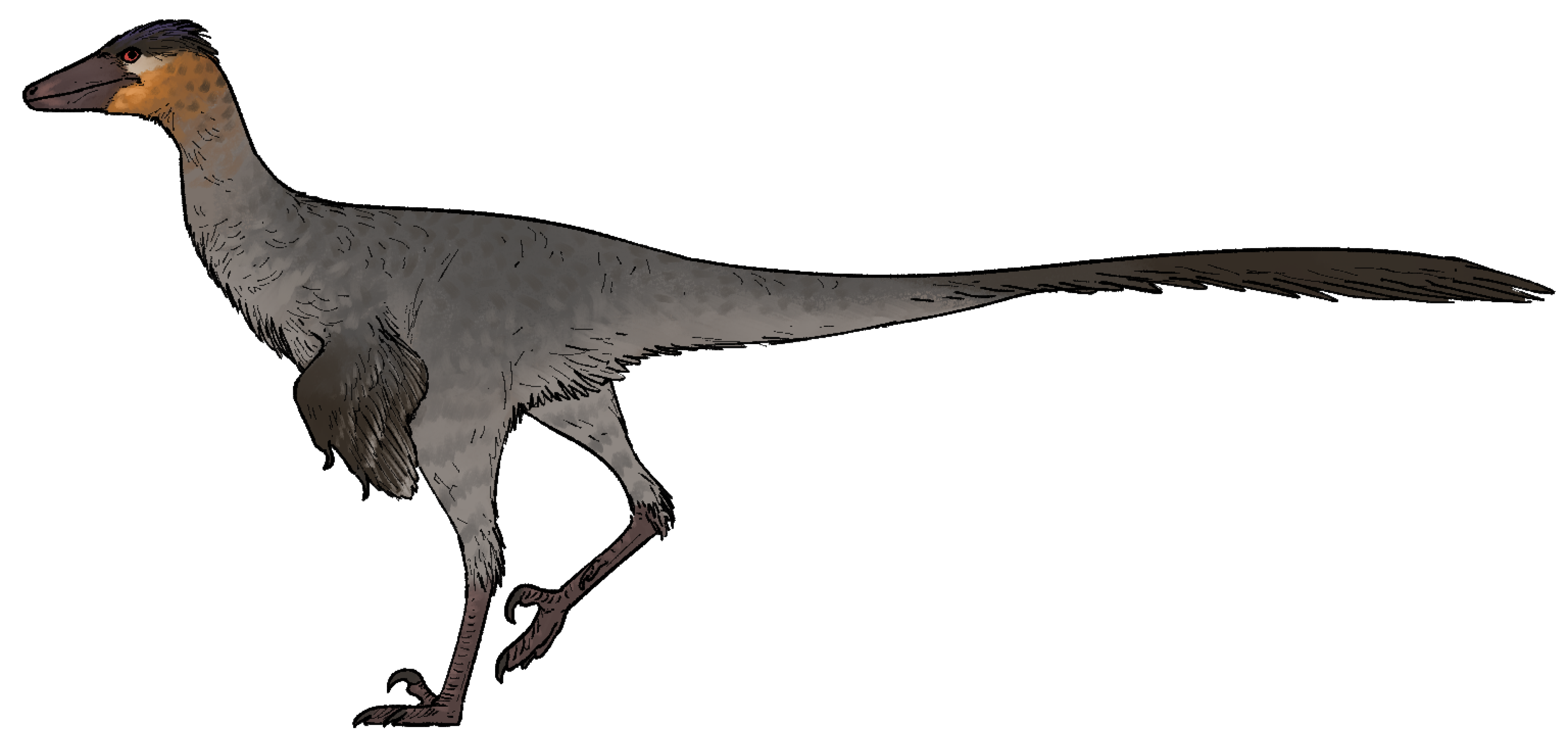
- Life restoration of U. norelli

Scientific classification
- Kingdom: Animalia
- Phylum: Chordata
- Class: Reptilia
- Clade: Dinosauria
- Clade: Saurischia
- Clade: Theropoda
- Family: †Troodontidae
- Subfamily: †Troodontinae
- Genus: †Urbacodon; Averianov & Sues, 2007

Type species
- Urbacodon itemirensis Averianov & Sues, 2007

Other species
- †U. norelli Wang et al., 2024

= Urbacodon =

Urbacodon Temporal range: Late Cretaceous, Cenomanian–Turonian

Extinct genus of dinosaurs

Urbacodon (meaning "URBAC tooth") is a genus of troodontid theropod dinosaur. Two species have been described, both of which are known from a partial dentary: U. itemirensis from the Dzharakuduk Formation (Cenomanian) of Uzbekistan and U. norelli from the Iren Dabasu Formation of China. Possible remains are also known from the Bissekty Formation (Turonian) of Uzbekistan.

== Discovery and naming ==
On 9 September 2004, a lower jaw of a small theropod was uncovered by Anton Sergeevich Rezwiy near Itemir in the IT-01 quarry near Dzharakuduk.

The type species, Urbacodon itemirensis, was named by Alexandr Averianov and Hans-Dieter Sues in 2007. The first part of the generic name Urbacodon is an acronym, honouring the Uzbek, Russian, British, American and Canadian scientists who participated in its discovery. This acronym was combined with a Greek ὀδών, odon, "tooth". The specific name refers to the provenance from Itemir.

The name was based on the holotype ZIN PH 944/16, a single left dentary with preserved replacement teeth from the Cenomanian Dzharakuduk Formation. Averianov and Sues also identified teeth and other material, earlier described by Lev Nessov, as a Urbacodon sp. from the nearby Turonian Bissekty Formation.

In 2024, Wang et al. described a partial right dentary collected from the Iren Dabasu Formation in the late 1990s. Based on similarities with U. itemirensis, they described the specimen as belonging to a new species of Urbacodon, which they named U. norelli. The two specimens share a lightly built and strap-like dentary that is curved inward at the tip, a symphyseal foramen on the dentary, and thickened dentary teeth, among other features.

== Description ==
The holotype dentary of U. itemirensis is 79.2 millimetres (3.12 in) long and has 32 tooth positions. It is rather straight in top view. The teeth are closely packed but between the front twenty-four teeth and the rear eight teeth, a distinctive gap is present, a diastema. This is a unique trait but was not formally designated as an autapomorphy because it might be the result of individual variation. Urbacodon resembles Byronosaurus and Mei but differs from most other Troodontidae in that its teeth lack serrations. Urbacodon is distinguished from Byronosaurus by a less vascularized lateral dentary groove and more bulbous anterior tooth crowns, and from Mei by considerably larger size.

== Classification ==
Averianov and Sues viewed Urbacodon itemirensis as more plesiomorphic than Troodon and Saurornithoides in having a straight dentary with fewer teeth, but did not attempt to place it on a cladogram. In 2010, a cladistic analysis showed it as a close relative of Byronosaurus and Xixiasaurus.

In their description of Urbacodon norelli, Wang et al. (2024) discussed the phylogenetic position of both species. They recovered Zanabazar as the sister taxon to Urbacodon as late-diverging members of the Troodontidae. Their results are displayed in the cladogram below:

- Troodontidae
  - - Sinovenator
    - Mei
  - - - LH PV39 (unnamed Wulansuhai Fm. taxon)
      - Sinornithoides
    - - MPC-D100/1126+D100/3500 (unnamed Djadokhta Fm. taxon)
      - - Almas
        - - - Philovenator
            - - Talos
              - Gobivenator
          - - Papiliovenator
            - - - Linhevenator
                - Troodon
              - - Zanabazar
                - - Urbacodon itemirensis
                  - Urbacodon norelli

== See also ==
- Timeline of troodontid research
