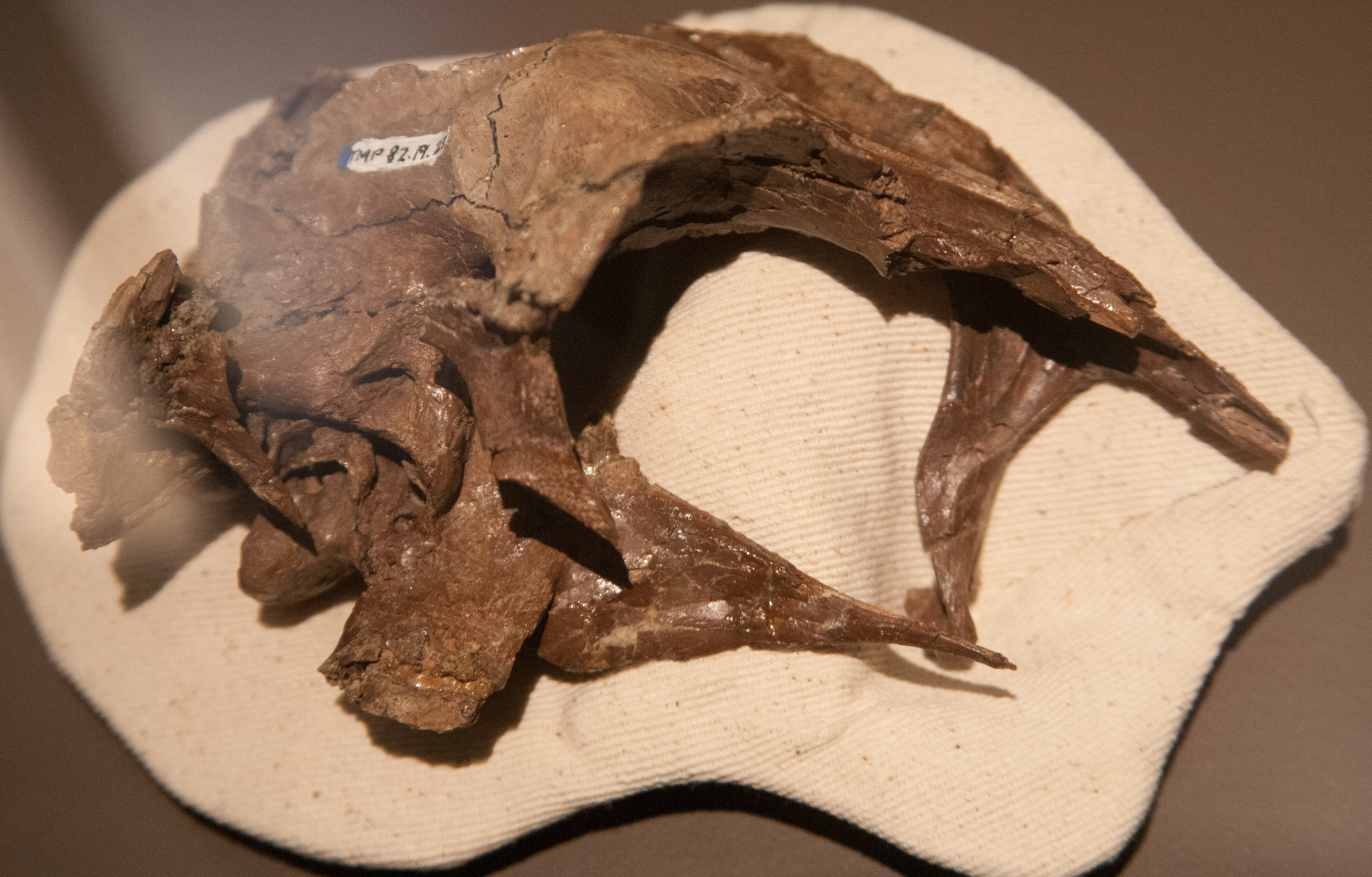
- Hind part of assigned skull TMP 1982.019.0023, Royal Tyrrell Museum

Scientific classification
- Kingdom: Animalia
- Phylum: Chordata
- Class: Reptilia
- Clade: Dinosauria
- Clade: Saurischia
- Clade: Theropoda
- Family: †Troodontidae
- Subfamily: †Troodontinae
- Genus: †Latenivenatrix van der Reest and Currie, 2017

Type species
- †Latenivenatrix mcmasterae van der Reest and Currie, 2017

= Latenivenatrix =

Latenivenatrix Temporal range: Campanian, 75.5 Ma

Extinct genus of dinosaurs

Latenivenatrix, meaning "hiding huntress", is a genus of large troodontid known from a single species, L. mcmasterae. Along with the contemporary Stenonychosaurus, it is known from non-tooth fossils that were formerly assigned to the now potentially dubious genus Troodon. Although described as separate, it has been considered a junior synonym of Stenonychosaurus.

== Discovery and specimens ==
The type specimen, or holotype, of Latenivenatrix (CMN 12340) was originally described in 1969 by Dale Alan Russell and referred by him to the genus Stenonychosaurus. In 1987, it was referred to Troodon. It was collected in 1968 by Irene Vanderloh in the Dinosaur Park Formation strata from Alberta, Canada. The specimen has preserved some skull bones, such as the frontals, parietals, postorbital, basioccipital, and basisphenoid, four vertebrae, four ribs, some chevrons, gastralia, a fairly complete arm, and incomplete legs.

Moreover, three additional specimens from the same locality are referred to L. mcmasterae. These include UALVP 55804 (a partial pelvis), TMP 1982.019.0023 (a partial skull), and TMP 1992.036.575 (a right dentary and several left metatarsals).

Latenivenatrix was suggested to be distinguishable from Stenonychosaurus due to the structure of its frontals and metatarsal III, although later analyses found these characters to be individually variable, and also present in specimens of Stenonychosaurus.

== Description ==
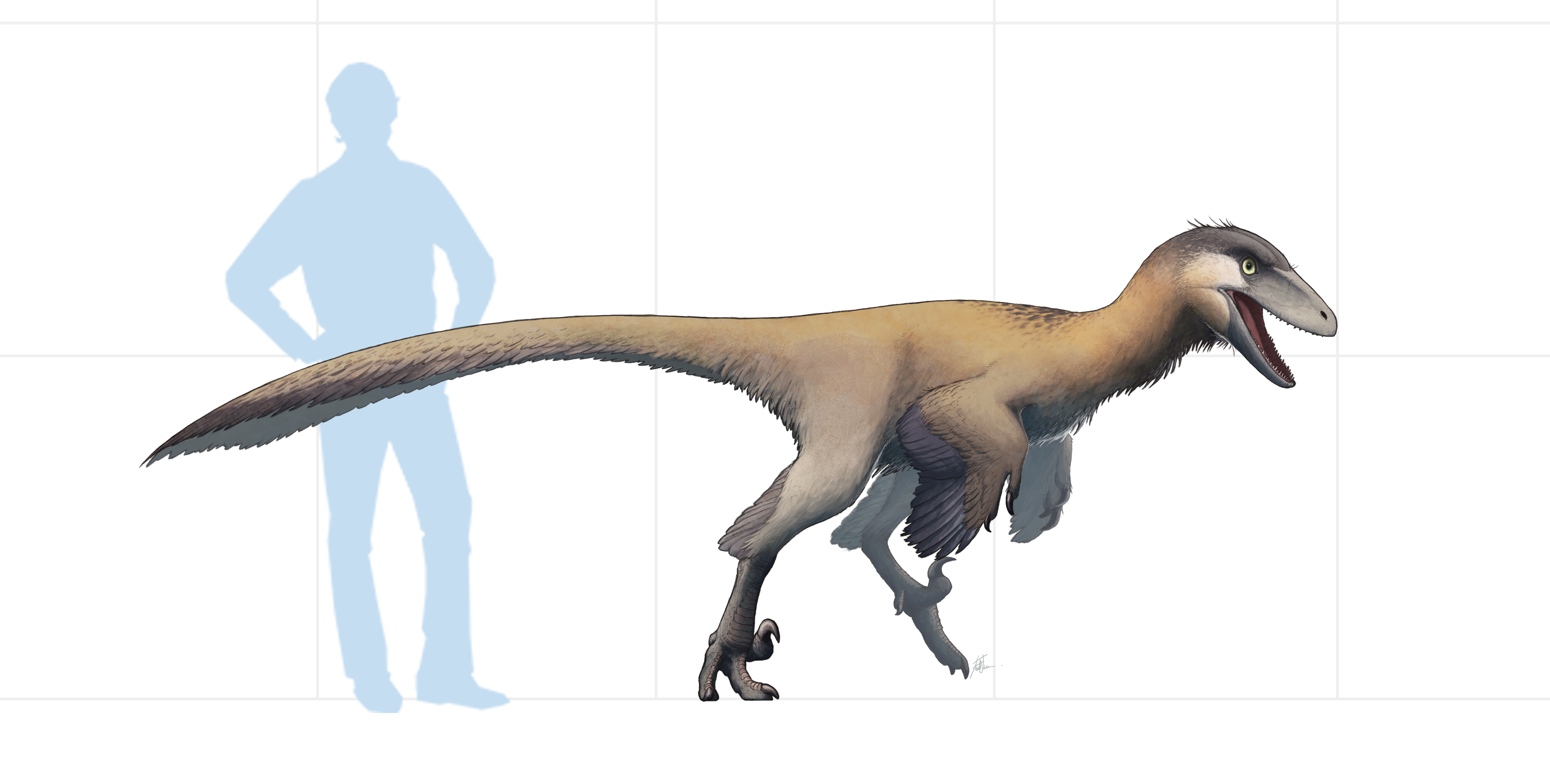
Life restoration with human to scale

With an estimated skull length of 45 centimetres (18 in) and a full body length of 3–3.5 metres (9.8–11.5 ft), Latenivenatrix is the largest troodontid known. It was described as distinguishable from other troodontids thanks to the following diagnostic (autapomorphic) traits residing in the pelvis: the pubis is retroverted forming a 17° angle; the pubic shaft is anteriorly curved; a large muscle scar on the lateral surface of the pubic shaft is present, slightly proximal to the pubic boot (this is seen also in dromaeosaurid Hesperonychus).

Other traits argued to further distinguish Latenivenatrix from other derived troodontids (particularly its close relative Stenonychosaurus) are: the triangular shape of each frontal bone which also does have a single deep groove in the frontonasal contact surface; a concave anterior surface of metatarsal III. While this trait appears to be absent in other derived troodontids such as Saurornithoides, Talos, and Urbacodon, it appears to be present in Philovenator as well and not clearly verifiable in several species.

A later re-analysis of the stratigraphic positions of known specimens of Latenivenatrix and Stenonychosaurus (including specimens not included in the initial description of L. mcmasterae) also found stratigraphic overlap between the two proposed taxa. Due to this stratigraphic overlap, as well as the lack of definitive diagnostic characters, the variable presence of characters originally described as autapomorphic of Latenivenatrix in specimens of Stenonychosaurus, and the extensive overlap of frontals of both in morphospace, L. mcmasterae was considered to be a junior synonym of S. inequalis.

== Phylogeny ==
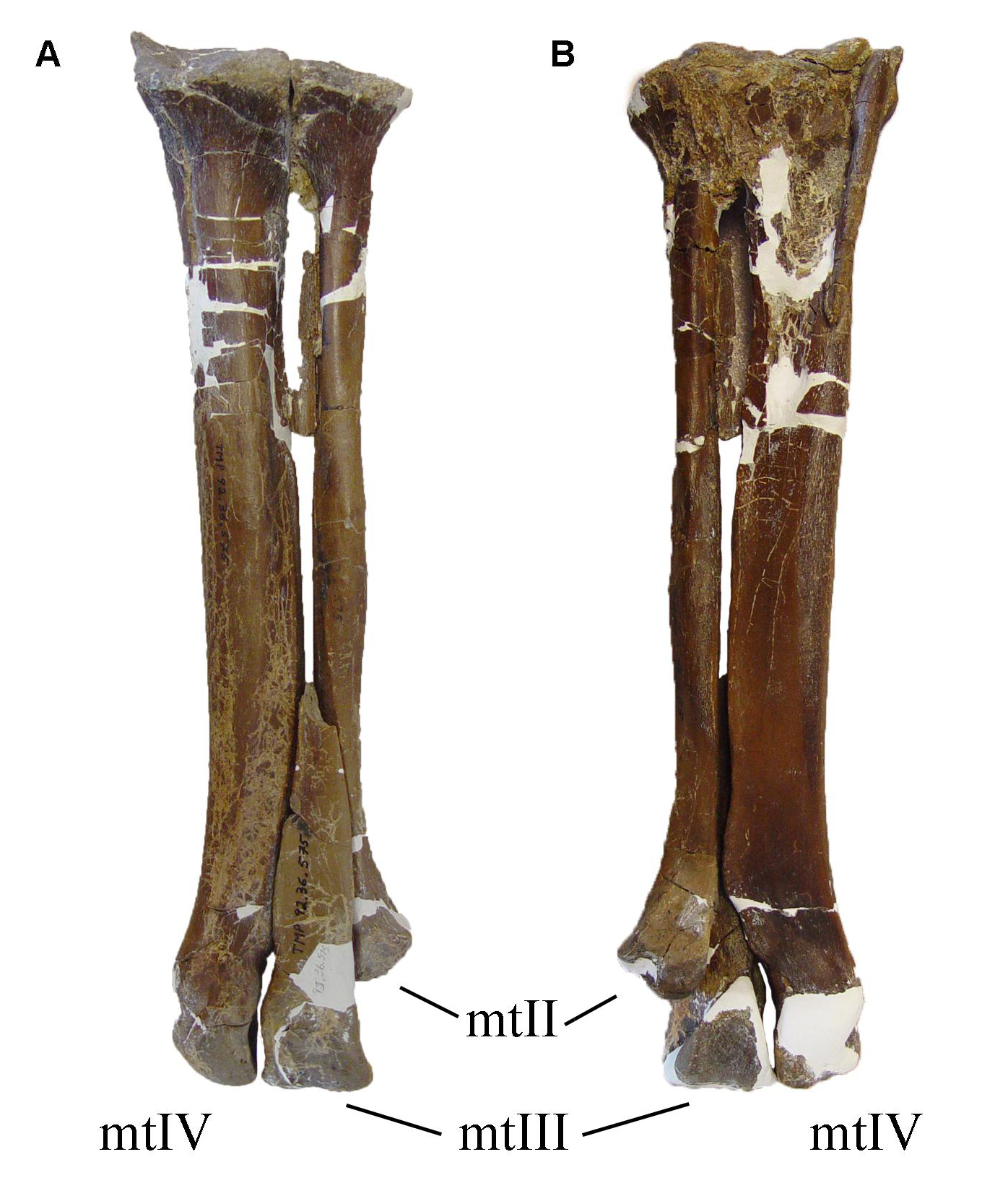
Left metatarsus of the holotype

Latenivenatrix was found to be a derived troodontid (part of the newly defined Troodontinae), probably related to coeval Asian forms such as Linhevenator and Philovenator.

== Paleobiology ==
Latenivenatrix was the largest known troodontid, with a maximum total body length estimated to 3.5 m (11.5 ft). As a derived troodontid, it was probably a semi-omnivorous biped with loss of the skills of a primitive flyer.

=== Paleopathology ===
A parietal bone catalogued as TMP 79.8.1 bears a "pathological aperture". In 1985, Phil Currie hypothesized that this aperture was caused by a cyst. Tanke and Rothschild interpreted it as a possible bite wound in 1999. One hatchling specimen may have suffered from a congenital defect, which resulted in the front part of its jaw being twisted.

== See also ==
- Timeline of troodontid research
- 2017 in archosaur paleontology
