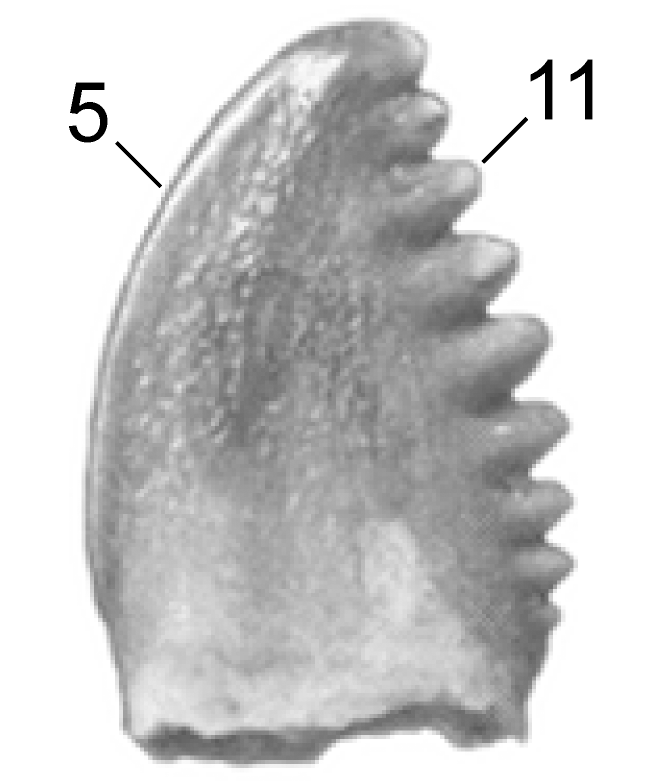
- Tooth of cf. Pectinodon

Scientific classification
- Kingdom: Animalia
- Phylum: Chordata
- Class: Reptilia
- Clade: Dinosauria
- Clade: Saurischia
- Clade: Theropoda
- Family: †Troodontidae
- Genus: †Pectinodon; Carpenter, 1982

Type species
- †Pectinodon bakkeri Carpenter, 1982

Synonyms
- Troodon bakkeri (Carpenter, 1982)

= Pectinodon =

Pectinodon Temporal range: Late Maastrichtian, 67–66 Ma

Genus of bird-like dinosaur

Pectinodon is a genus of troodontid theropod dinosaurs from the end of the Maastrichtian age of the Late Cretaceous period (66 mya). It currently contains a single valid species, Pectinodon bakkeri (sometimes classified as Troodon bakkeri), known only from teeth.

== History of discovery ==
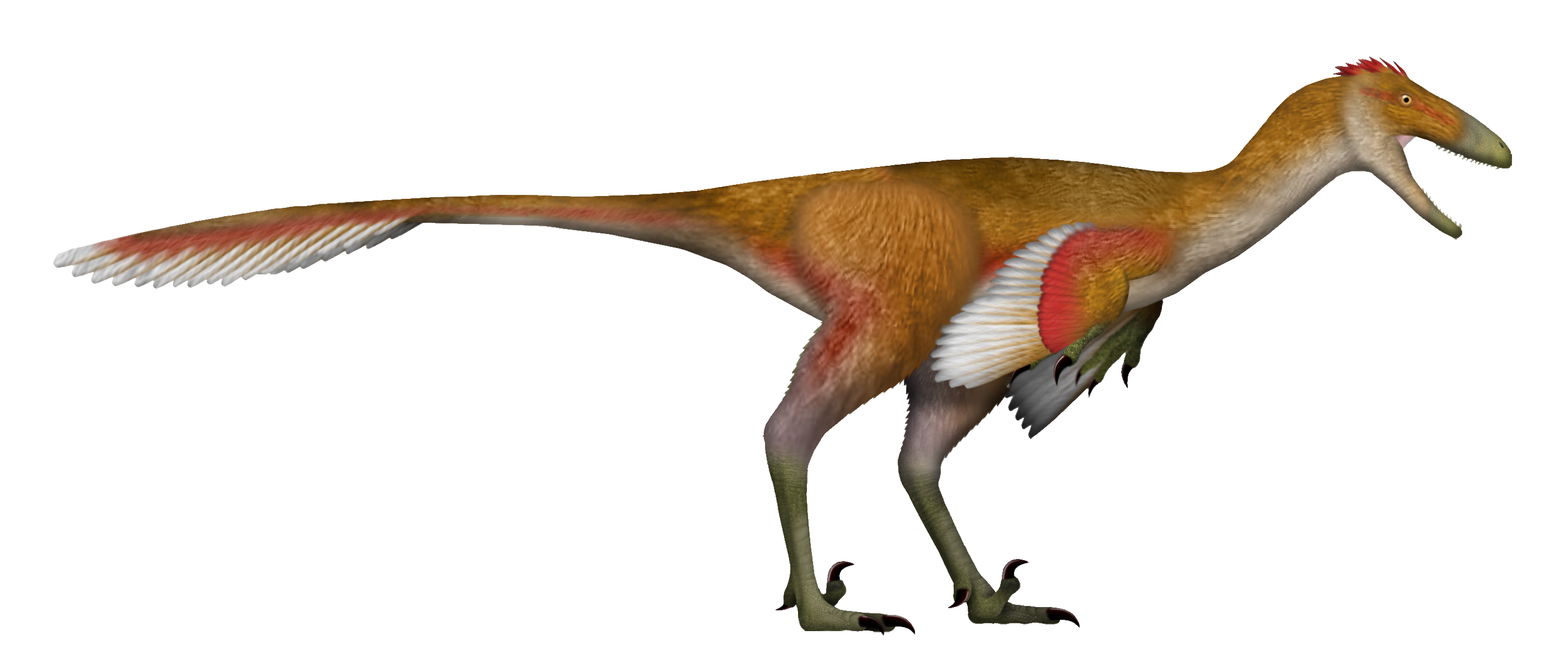
Hypothetical life restoration

In 1982, Kenneth Carpenter named a number of theropod teeth from the late Maastrichtian aged Lance Formation of Wyoming as the type species Pectinodon bakkeri. The generic name is derived from the Latin word pecten, meaning "comb", and the Greek word ὀδών, odon, meaning "tooth", in reference to the comb-like serrations on the rear edge of the teeth. The specific name honors famed paleontologist Robert Thomas Bakker.

The holotype, UCM 38445, consists of a 6.2 mm long adult tooth. The paratypes are three juvenile teeth.

In 1985, Lev Nessov named a second species, Pectinodon asiamericanus, based on specimen CCMGE 49/12176, a tooth from the Khodzhakul Formation of Uzbekistan that dates from the Cenomanian age. This is today often considered a nomen dubium.

While historically considered synonymous with Troodon or more specifically the species Troodon formosus, Philip Currie and colleagues (1990) noted that the P. bakkeri fossils from the Hell Creek Formation and Lance Formation might belong to different species. In 1991, George Olshevsky assigned the Lance formation fossils to the species Troodon bakkeri. In 2011, Zanno and colleagues reviewed the convoluted history of troodontid classification in Late Cretaceous North America. They followed Longrich (2008) in treating Pectinodon bakkeri as a valid genus and noted that it is likely the numerous Late Cretaceous specimens currently assigned to Troodon formosus almost certainly represent numerous new species, but that a more thorough review of the specimens is required.

In 2013, Currie and Derek Larson concluded that Pectinodon bakkeri was valid and its teeth could be found both in the Lance Formation and the coeval Hell Creek Formation. Some teeth from the older Campanian Dinosaur Park Formation could not be statistically differentiated from them, likely due to an insufficiently large sample, and were referred to cf. Pectinodon.

== Description ==
While Pectinodon is only known from teeth, its larger family Troodontidae is known from much more complete specimens. They were small, bird-like feathered bipedal maniraptorans with proportionally large eyes and brains. Like dromaeosaurids, they possessed a "sickle-claw" on the second toe of each foot. See the Troodontidae article for more information.

Pectinodon's eponymous teeth are generally small (< 1 cm crown height) labio-lingually compressed, exhibit basal constriction, and possess large, triangular, apically-oriented denticles on the distal edge. The holotype tooth has pitting on the lingual surface and no denticles on the mesial carina, though other specimens are known to have fine serrations near the base of the crown on the mesial carina.

== Paleobiology ==
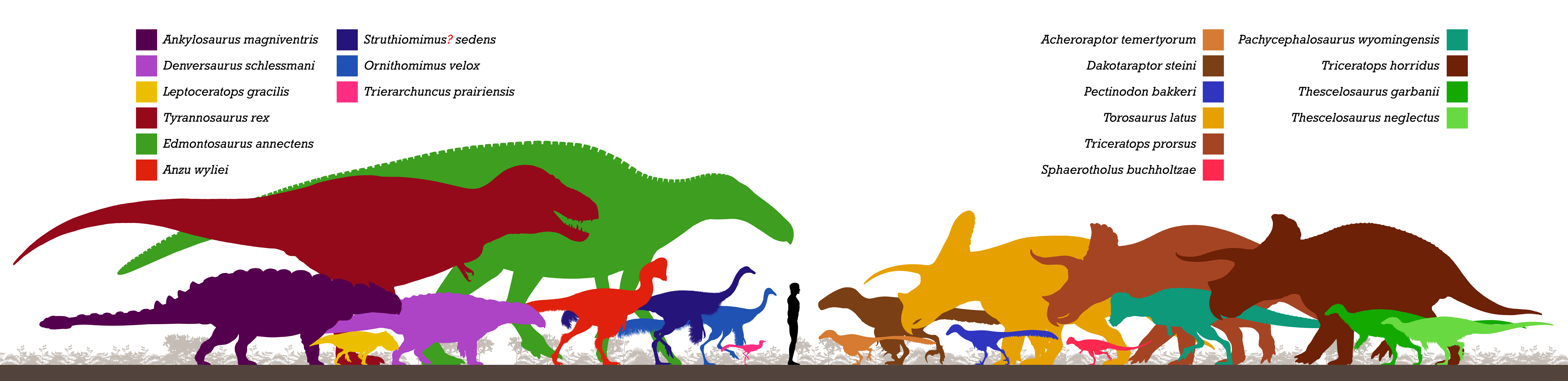
Fauna of the Hell Creek Formation (Pectinodon in Royal Blue)

Despite having only teeth to infer behavior for Pectinodon, they are very informative fossils. Several studies have been done on troodontid teeth, shedding light on their behavior and ecology. Their tooth morphology suggests they preferred soft prey items like invertebrates, small vertebrates, or carrion. Their dentition was not as well suited for high-stress feeding as in their cousins the dromaeosaurids and tyrannosaurids. Tooth morphology also led some researchers to speculate that troodontids were omnivorous. This hypothesis was reaffirmed in a study that used stable isotopes in tooth enamel to reconstruct paleo-ecologies.

== See also ==
- Troodontidae
- Timeline of troodontid research
