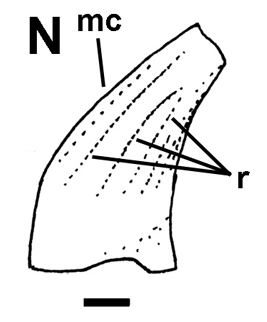
- Euronychodon tooth crown

Scientific classification
- Kingdom: Animalia
- Phylum: Chordata
- Class: Reptilia
- Clade: Dinosauria
- Clade: Saurischia
- Clade: Theropoda
- Family: †Troodontidae
- Genus: †Euronychodon; Antunes & Sigogneau-Russell, 1991

Type species
- †Euronychodon portucalensis Antunes & Sigogneau-Russell, 1991

Species
- †E. portucalensis Antunes & Sigogneau-Russell, 1991; †E. asiaticus Nessov, 1995

= Euronychodon =

Euronychodon Temporal range: Late Cretaceous, 92–70 Ma

Extinct genus of dinosaurs

Euronychodon ("European claw tooth") is the name given to a genus of coelurosaur dinosaur from the Late Cretaceous of Europe and Asia. A small-sized dinosaur estimated to measure around 2 m (6.6 ft) in length, Euronychodon is known from teeth only. These are similar to those of another coelurosaur tooth genus, Paronychodon.

== Species ==
Two species of Euronychodon have been named to date.

- E. portucalensis (named for Portugal, from Portucale, an old name of Porto): the remains consist of three teeth. In 1988 referred to Paronychodon lacustris, they were later considered diagnostic enough for them to represent a distinct genus and species. They were found at the locality of Taveiro, dated as Campanian-Maastrichtian (about 70 million years old). The type species of Euronychodon, E. portucalensis was named and described in 1991 by Miguel Telles Antunes and Denise Sigogneau-Russell. The generic name is a contraction of "Europe" and Paronychodon. The holotype CEPUNL TV 20, is one of the teeth. It is 1.8 millimetres long, recurved and strongly elongated with a D-shaped cross-section. The other two teeth, CEPUNL TV 18 and CEPUNL TV 19, are the paratypes.
- E. asiaticus (named for Asia): the referred fossils consist of seven teeth, found in the Bissekty Formation of Uzbekistan, (dated to about 92 million years ago) and named and described by Lev Nessov in 1995. The holotype is CCMGE N 9/12454; the other six teeth are the paratypes. The type tooth has fourteen vertical ridges on the inner side. It is usually considered a nomen dubium. It is much earlier than E. portucalensis, which means it could belong to a different animal. Nessov himself considered Euronychodon a pure form taxon and suggested such deviant teeth grew accidentally, when tooth pairs happened to develop on closing jaw bone sutures with juvenile individuals.

== Systematics ==
Being a tooth-taxon, the true affinities of Euronychodon are hard to determine. The teeth are similar to the better-known Paronychodon, which may be a senior synonym. Paronychodon was originally described as similar to Zapsalis, another tooth taxon often considered synonymous with Richardoestesia (a possible dromaeosaurid). It later had many different identifications: as a coelurid, an ornithomimosaur, a dromaeosaurid, an archaeopterygid and a troodontid — though it could also be another kind of coelurosaurian theropod. While most researchers have therefore considered such taxa as representing simply indeterminate theropod teeth, a small consensus has found them to belong to the Deinonychosauria. One study showed that the tooth enamel is identical to that found in Byronosaurus, a troodontid.

== Palaeobiology ==
The remains indicate a small animal, estimated at around two meters (6.6 feet). The teeth indicate a carnivorous or insectivorous diet. Taveirosaurus was found at the same locality.

== See also ==
- Timeline of troodontid research
