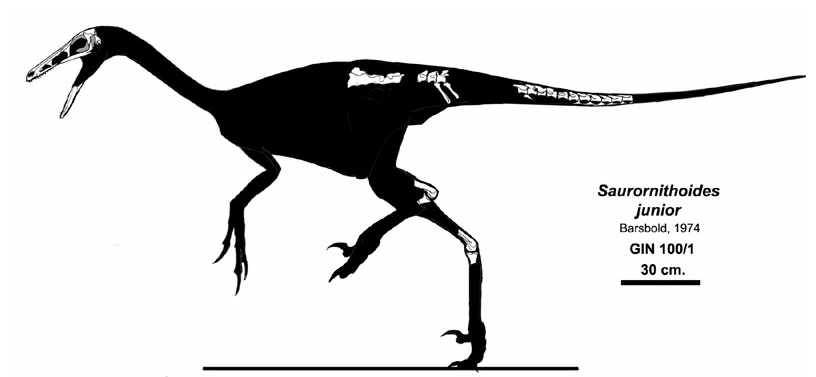
- Skeletal restoration of IGM 100/1

Scientific classification
- Kingdom: Animalia
- Phylum: Chordata
- Class: Reptilia
- Clade: Dinosauria
- Clade: Saurischia
- Clade: Theropoda
- Family: †Troodontidae
- Subfamily: †Troodontinae
- Genus: †Zanabazar; Norell et al., 2009
- Species: †Z. junior

Binomial name
- †Zanabazar junior (Barsbold, 1974)

Synonyms
- Saurornithoides junior Barsbold, 1974

= Zanabazar junior =

Zanabazar junior Temporal range: Late Cretaceous, Maastrichtian

Extinct species of dinosaur

Zanabazar is a genus of large troodontid dinosaurs from the Late Cretaceous of Mongolia. The genus was originally named by Rinchen Barsbold as the new species Saurornithoides junior. In 2009 it was reclassified as its own genus and species, Zanabazar junior, named after Zanabazar, the first spiritual figurehead of Tibetan Buddhism in Mongolia. The holotype includes a skull, vertebrae, and right hindlimb. Zanabazar was one of the largest and most derived troodontids.

== History of discovery ==
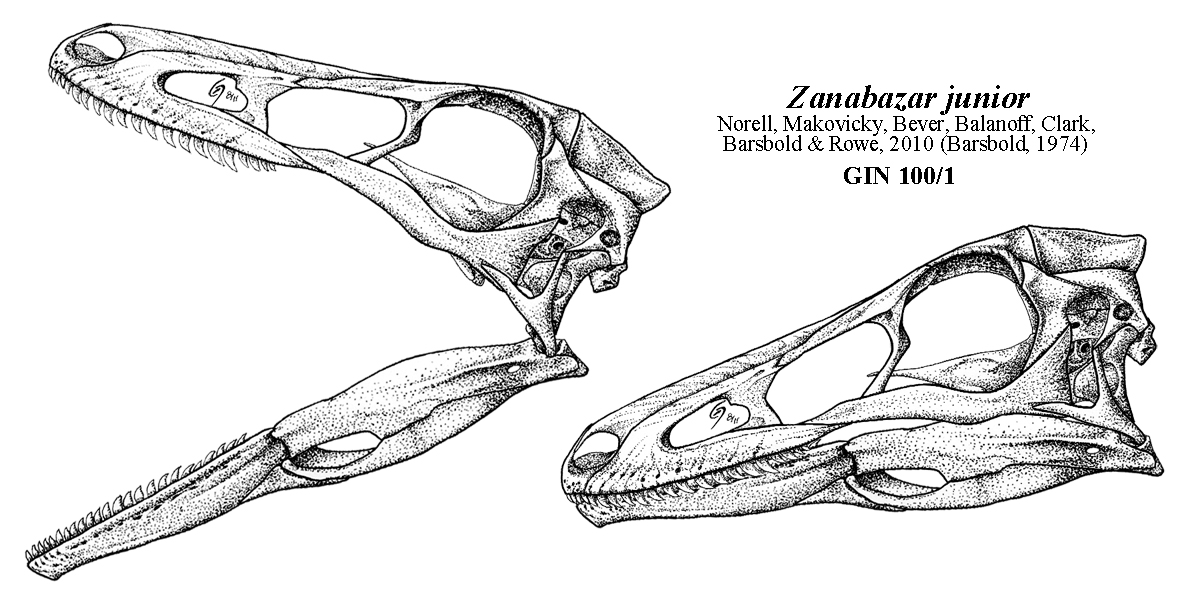
Reconstructed skull of IGM 100/1

The holotype was discovered in 1964 from the Bügiin Tsav locality of the Nemegt Formation and initially described by Rinchen Barsbold as a new species of Saurornithoides (S. junior) in 1974. This specimen, IGM 100/1, includes a nearly complete skull and braincase, part of the pelvis, some tail vertebrae, and parts of the right hindlimb. In 2009 a review of the genus found that the support for S. junior in the same genus as S. mongoliensis was lacking. Mark Norell and colleagues re-classified the species in the new genus Zanabazar, which they named in honor of Zanabazar, the first spiritual head (Bogd Gegen) of Tibetan Buddhism in Outer Mongolia.

== Description ==
Size comparison of the holotype

Zanabazar were large troodontids reaching 2.3 m (7.5 ft) in length and weighing 25 kg (55 lb). They are the largest known Asian troodontids, with a skull length of 27.2 cm (272 mm). At the time of the discovery of the genus, the only other troodontids that appeared to be larger than it were specimens from Alaska, however, Latenivenatrix are now considered the largest troodontids with 3.5 m (11 ft) in length. The preserved vertebrae in IGM 100/1 are completely fused, indicating that this individual was an adult at the time of death.

== Classification ==
While originally included in Saurornithoides, within the family Saurornithoididae, Zanabazar is now thought to be a derived member of Troodontidae.

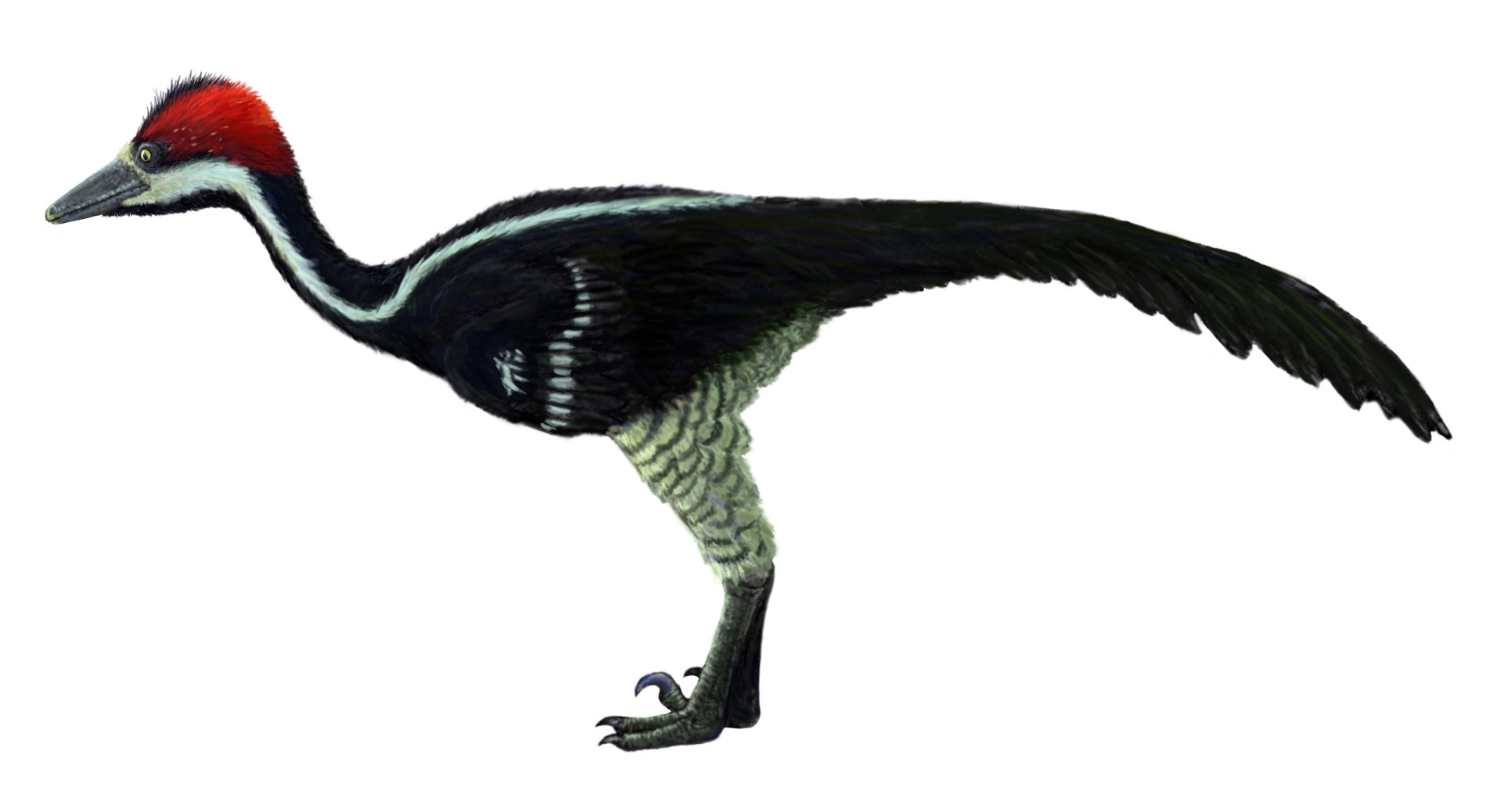
Life restoration

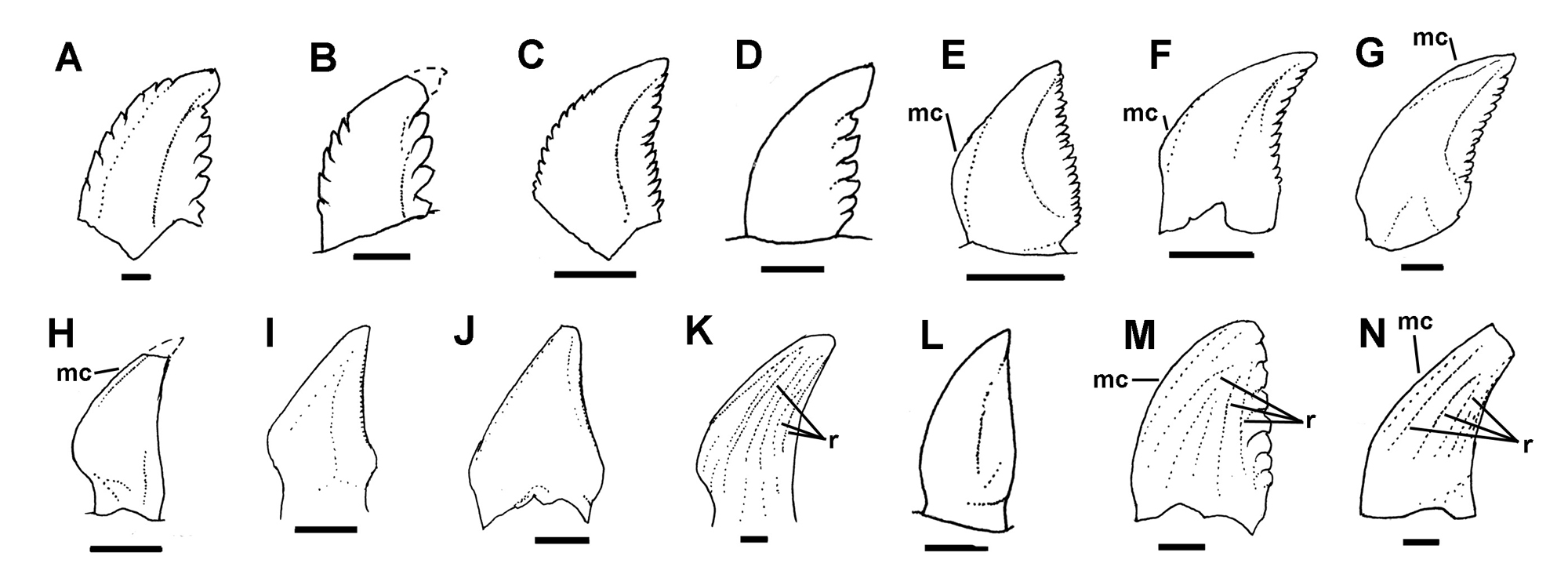
Comparison of troodontid teeth; C, D, F, and G are Zanabazar

The cladogram below shows the phylogenetic position of Zanabazar among other troodontids following a 2014 analysis.

- Paraves
  - Avialae
  - Deinonychosauria
    - Dromaeosauridae
    - Troodontidae
      - Sinovenator
      - - Anchiornis
        - - Mei
          - Talos
          - - Byronosaurus
            - - IGM 100/44
              - Sinornithoides
              - - - Linhevenator
                  - Philovenator
                - - Gobivenator
                  - - Troodon
                    - - Saurornithoides
                      - Zanabazar

== See also ==
- Timeline of troodontid research
