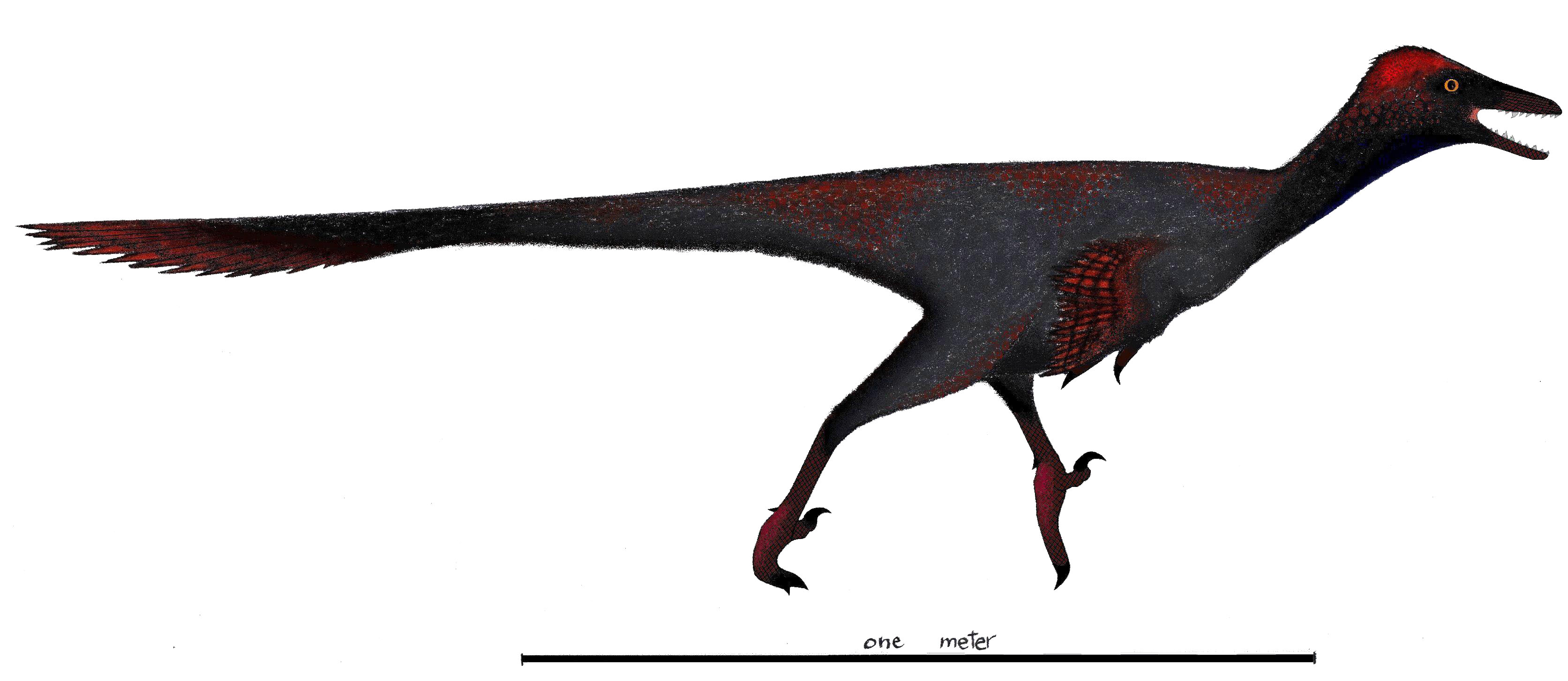
- Restoration of Gobivenator

Scientific classification
- Kingdom: Animalia
- Phylum: Chordata
- Class: Reptilia
- Clade: Dinosauria
- Clade: Saurischia
- Clade: Theropoda
- Family: †Troodontidae
- Subfamily: †Troodontinae
- Genus: †Gobivenator; Tsuihiji et al., 2014

Type species
- †Gobivenator mongoliensis Tsuihiji et al., 2014

= Gobivenator =

Gobivenator Temporal range: Late Cretaceous, 72 Ma

Extinct genus of dinosaurs

Gobivenator is an extinct genus of troodontid theropod dinosaur known from the late Campanian Djadokhta Formation of central Gobi Desert, Mongolia. It contains a single species, Gobivenator mongoliensis. G. mongoliensis is known from a single individual, which represents the most complete specimen of a Late Cretaceous troodontid currently known.

== Discovery ==
Gobivenator was first described and named by Takanobu Tsuihiji, Rinchen Barsbold, Mahito Watabe, Khishigjav Tsogtbaatar, Tsogtbaatar Chinzorig, Yoshito Fujiyama and Shigeru Suzuki in 2014 and the type species is Gobivenator mongoliensis. The generic name is derived from the name of the Gobi Desert, where the holotype was found, and venator meaning "hunter" in Latin. The specific name refers to its occurrence in Mongolia, as the Latin suffix -ensis means "from".

Gobivenator is known solely from the holotype MPC-D 100/86, a nearly complete and articulated skeleton including the skull, housed at the Mongolian Paleontological Center at Ulaanbaatar, Mongolia. The skull of MPC-D 100/86 is mostly undistorted and well preserved, lacking only the tip of the snout, while the rest of the skeleton is missing only middle cervical vertebrae, forelimb bones located lower than the elbow joints, some hindlimb bones, and most gastralia. It was discovered by a Japanese-Mongolian expedition, and represents the most complete specimen of a Late Cretaceous troodontid presently known. Additionally, unlike most troodontid fossils, MPC-D 100/86 is fully articulated and three-dimensionally preserved. It was collected from the Dzamin Khond locality of the Djadokhta Formation in the central Gobi Desert, dating to the late Campanian stage of the Late Cretaceous, approximately 72 million years ago.

== Description ==
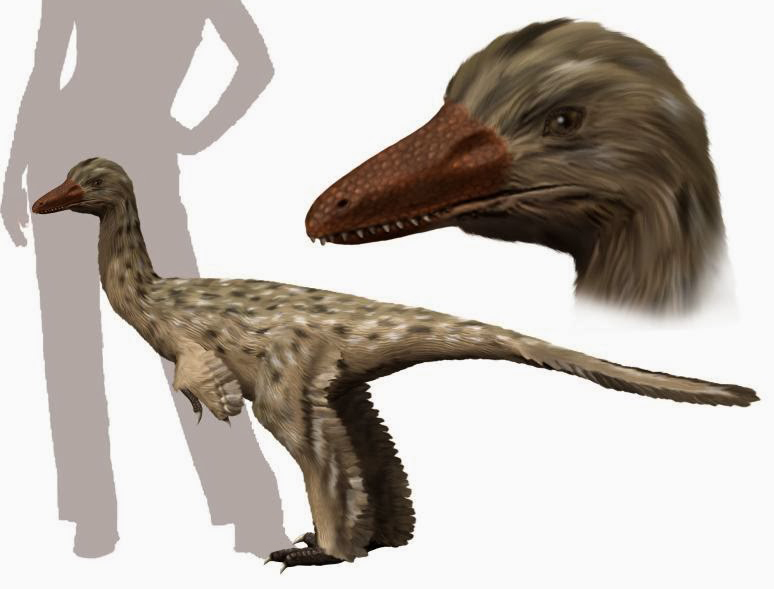
Restoration and size comparison

Gobivenator was a small theropod, measuring 1.7 metres (5.6 ft) long and weighing 9 kilograms (20 lb). It belongs to the family Troodontidae, a group of small, bird-like, gracile maniraptorans. All troodontids have many unique features of the skull, such as closely spaced teeth in the lower jaw, and large numbers of teeth. Troodontids have sickle-claws and raptorial hands, and some of the highest non-avian encephalization quotients, meaning they were behaviourally advanced and had keen senses. Gobivenator possesses two autapomorphies, unique traits, that differentiate it from all other currently known troodontids. The parietal bones are fused with a pointed anterior end, and a fossa is present on the surangular of the lower jaw, in front of the rear surangular foramen. Two other traits are possible autapomorphies: the gracile build of the three postorbital branches and the elongation of the upper chevrons. The skull of Gobivenator is very well preserved, and shows an enlarged maxillary fenestra and an anterior process of the lacrimal which is much longer than the supraorbital process, features that are typical among troodontids. Gobivenator provides detailed information on many aspects of the poorly-understood anatomy of Troodontidae, including the morphology of the palate, supporting close relations with the dromaeosaurids and basal birds, like Archaeopteryx. It appears that toward the basal Avialae the pterygoid bone of the palatine becomes more elongated, while the pterygopalatine suture becomes reduced. Even though the skull of Gobivenator is akinetic, it already possesses preconditions for later evolution of cranial kinesis in birds, like the loss of the epipterygoid bone and a reduced contact areas between palate bones.

== Phylogeny ==
The phylogenetic position of Gobivenator was explored by Tsuihiji et al. (2014) using the data matrix published by Gao et al. (2012), a slightly modified version of Xu et al. (2011) analysis. The resultant matrix includes 91 coelurosaurs and outgroup taxa which are scored based on 363 morphological traits. Gobivenator was recovered as an advanced troodontid, closely related to other Late Cretaceous troodontids, such as Saurornithoides and Zanabazar from Mongolia, and Troodon from North America. The cladogram below shows the phylogenetic position of Gobivenator among the Troodontidae following this analysis.

- Paraves
  - Avialae
  - Deinonychosauria
    - Dromaeosauridae
    - Troodontidae
      - Sinovenator
      - - Anchiornis
        - - Mei
          - Talos
          - - Byronosaurus
            - - IGM 100/44
              - Sinornithoides
              - - - Linhevenator
                  - Philovenator
                - - Gobivenator
                  - - Troodon
                    - - Saurornithoides
                      - Zanabazar

A 2024 study on Hypnovenator recovered Gobivenator as a basal member of the Troodontinae, as its sister taxon.

== See also ==
- Timeline of troodontid research
