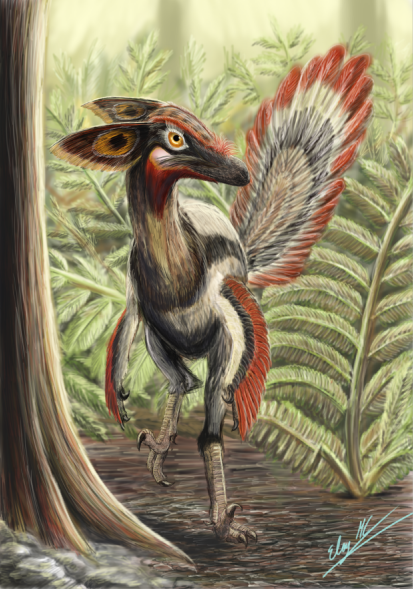
- Life restoration

Scientific classification
- Kingdom: Animalia
- Phylum: Chordata
- Class: Reptilia
- Clade: Dinosauria
- Clade: Saurischia
- Clade: Theropoda
- Family: †Troodontidae
- Subfamily: †Troodontinae
- Genus: †Philovenator; Xu et al., 2012
- Species: †P. curriei

Binomial name
- †Philovenator curriei Xu et al., 2012

= Philovenator =

Philovenator Temporal range: Late Cretaceous, 75 Ma

Extinct genus of dinosaurs

Philovenator (literally meaning "love hunter") is an extinct genus of troodontid paravian dinosaurs from the Wulansuhai Formation (dated to the Campanian age, sometime between 75 and 71 million years ago) of Inner Mongolia, China. Its specific name honors Phillip J. Currie.

== Description ==
Philovenator is a troodontid, a group of small, bird-like, gracile maniraptorans. All troodontids have many unique features of the skull, such as closely spaced teeth in the lower jaw, and large numbers of teeth. Troodontids have sickle-claws and raptorial hands, and some of the highest non-avian encephalization quotients, meaning they were behaviourally advanced and had keen senses.

Several distinguishing traits were established in the initial description. The thighbone possesses a distinctive process at the inner side of the lower end. The shinbone has on the upper front side a plate-like cnemial crest, protruding far to the front. The condyles of the astragalus and calcaneum are wide, measured from the front to the rear, and are separated by a deep and narrow groove. The metatarsus has fused with the lower ankle bones into a very elongated and narrow tarsometatarsus, being 25% longer than the thighbone and twenty-five times longer than wide. Of this tarsometatarsus the thickness of the middle section of the shaft, measured from the front to the rear in a vertical position, is larger than its transverse width. The fourth metatarsal at its underside, if the bone is held in a horizontal position, has a flange along most of the shaft length, being almost as wide as the remainder of the shaft.

== History of discovery ==
Philovenator is known from a single left hindlimb, first discovered in 1988 by the China-Canada Dinosaur Project. The specimen was catalogued as IVPP V 10597. It was found in the Wulansuhai Formation, of China. In 1993, it was described, and assigned as a juvenile of Saurornithoides. Its juvenile status is reflected by the small size of the type specimen which indicates a total body length of about two feet. The authors, Philip J. Currie and Peng, did not find any autapomorphies of Saurornithoides, but based on the then current knowledge of anatomy and genera, the assignment was reasonable. In 2011, Linhevenator was described, and IVPP V 10597 was shown to have many similarities to this new taxon, possibly being a juvenile. However, a 2012 study of the histology and osteology of IVPP V 10597 determined that it was a new taxon related to Linhevenator, and it was named Philovenator curriei by Xu Xing e.a.. The name is derived from "Phil" and "currie", for Philip J. Currie, as well as the Greek φιλειν (philein), "to love", and Latin venator, or "hunter", suggesting it loved hunting.

== Classification ==
The phylogenetic relationships of Troodontidae were explored by Tsuihiji et al. (2014) using the data matrix published by Gao et al. (2012), a slightly modified version of Xu et al. (2011) analysis. The resultant matrix includes 91 coelurosaurs and outgroup taxa which are scored based on 363 morphological traits. Philovenator was recovered as an advanced troodontid, closely related to other Late Cretaceous troodontids, such as Saurornithoides and Zanabazar from Mongolia, and Troodon from North America. The cladogram below shows the phylogenetic position of Philovenator among the Troodontidae following this analysis.

- Paraves
  - Avialae
  - Deinonychosauria
    - Dromaeosauridae
    - Troodontidae
      - Sinovenator
      - - Anchiornis
        - - Mei
          - Talos
          - - Byronosaurus
            - - IGM 100/44
              - Sinornithoides
              - - - Linhevenator
                  - Philovenator
                - - Gobivenator
                  - - Troodon
                    - - Saurornithoides
                      - Zanabazar
