= Lev Alexandrovich Nessov =

Russian ornithologist and paleontologist

Lev Nessov
- Born: Lev Alexandrovich Nessov; 1947; Tallinn
- Died: 1995 (aged 48)
- Education: Leningrad State University
- Known for: Research on Mesozoic vertebrates of Central Asia
- Scientific career
- Fields: Paleontology

Lev Alexandrovich Nessov (Russian: Лев Александрович Несов; 1947 — 1995) was a Russian paleontologist.

== Biography ==
Lev Alexandrovich Nessov was born in Tallinn, Estonia in 1947. He graduated with a degree in paleontology from Leningrad State University in 1969. His main research focus was on Mesozoic vertebrates from the Soviet part of Central Asia.

Nessov often took the train or bus from Leningrad to Central Asia where he took long hikes into the desert to find fossils.

He authored two scientific monographs and about 170 research articles. Nessov established more than 350 taxa of extinct organisms.

Several taxa were named in his honor: Samrukia nessovi (pterosaur), Gurilynia nessovi and Explorornis nessovi (Cretaceous birds), Levnesovia (hadrosaur), Nessovbaatar (multituberculate), Deltatheridium nessovi (Cretaceous mammal), Karakhtia nessovi (vendobiont) and Puppigerus nessovi (Eocene sea turtle).

Nessov took his own life in 1995 at the age of 48 because the dissolution of the Soviet Union resulted that his travels were restricted.
