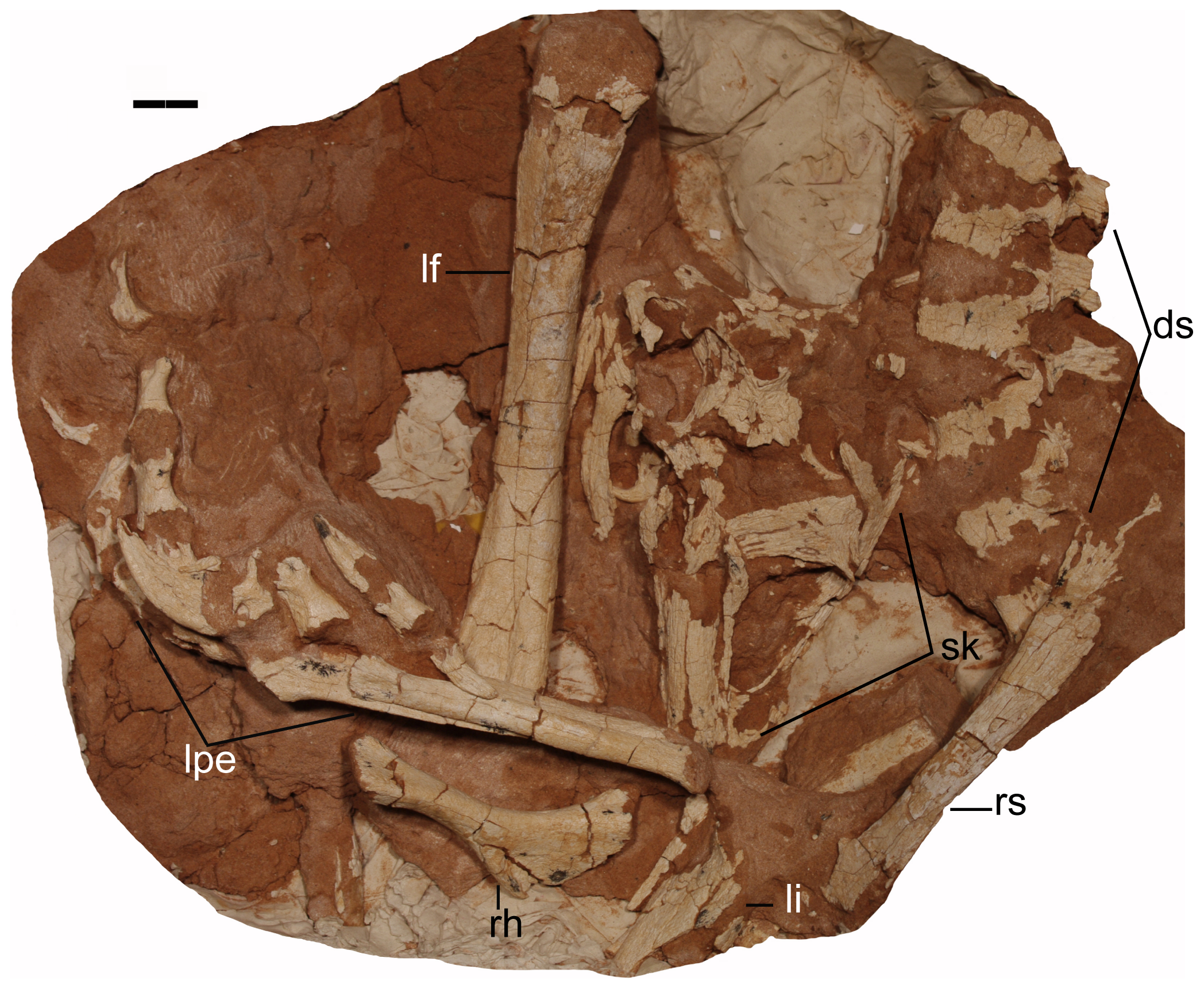
- Holotype Fossil

Scientific classification
- Kingdom: Animalia
- Phylum: Chordata
- Class: Reptilia
- Clade: Dinosauria
- Clade: Saurischia
- Clade: Theropoda
- Family: †Troodontidae
- Subfamily: †Troodontinae
- Genus: †Linhevenator; Xu et al., 2011
- Species: †L. tani

Binomial name
- †Linhevenator tani Xu et al., 2011

= Linhevenator =

Linhevenator Temporal range: Late Cretaceous, 75 Ma

Extinct genus of dinosaurs

Linhevenator is a genus of short-armed troodontid theropod dinosaur from the Upper Cretaceous (Campanian) Bayan Mandahu Formation of Bayan Mandahu, Inner Mongolia, China.

== Discovery ==
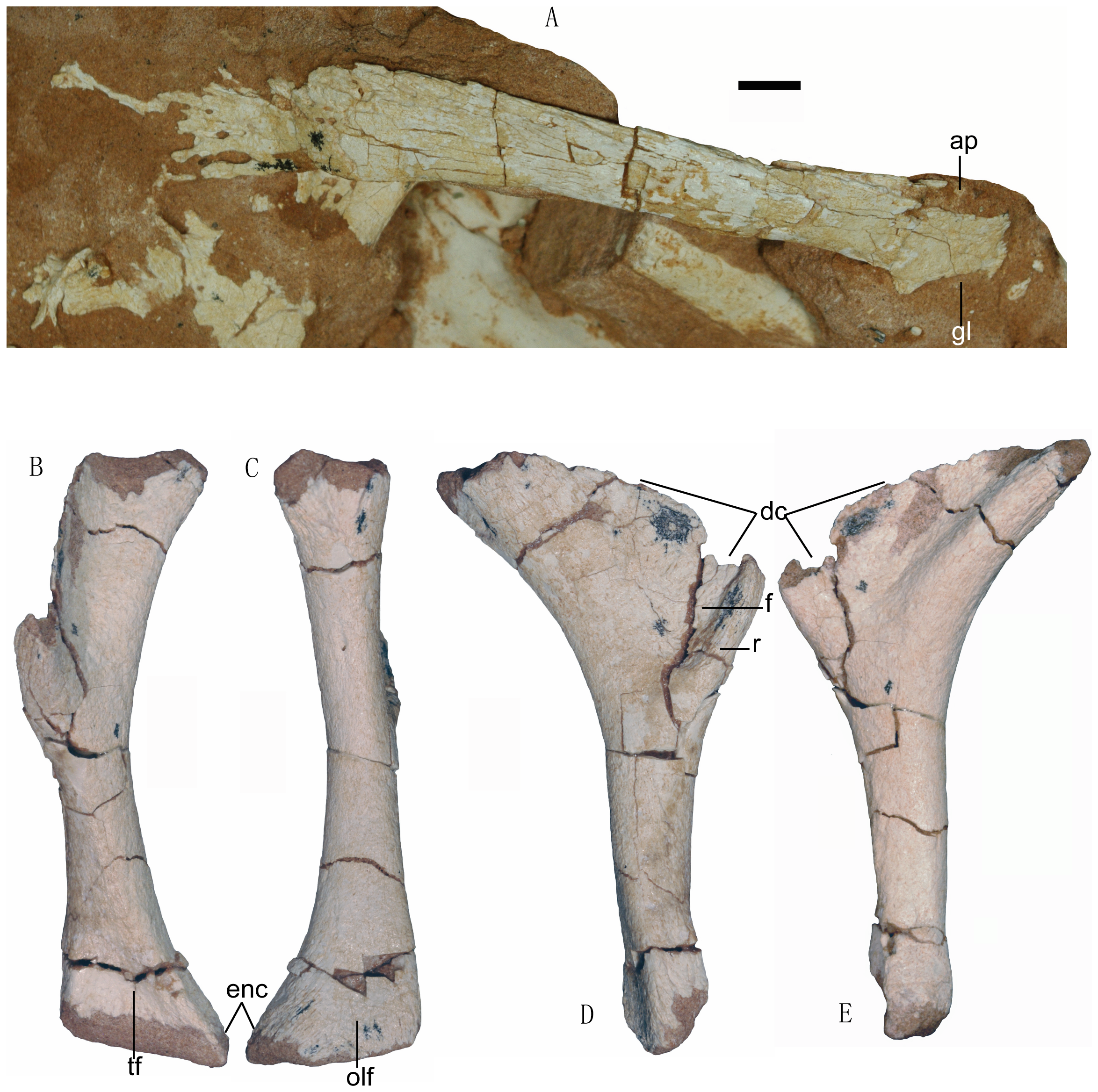
Pectoral girdle and forelimb

The type species Linhevenator tani was named and described in 2011 by Xu Xing, Tan Qingwei, Corwin Sullivan, Han Fenglu and Xiao Dong. The generic name combines a reference to the Linhe region with a Latin venator, "hunter". The specific name honours Professor Tan Lin.

The holotype of Linhevenator is specimen LHV0021, a partial skeleton of an adult individual, including a cranium and mandible, six dorsal vertebrae, a right scapula, a right humerus, the ilia, a left femur and a left foot. It was found in 2009 and represents the most complete troodontid remains known from the Upper Cretaceous. Its four autapomorphies (unique traits) include a jugal with a lateral flange, a surangular crest that is anteroventrally oriented, the presence of medial expansion near the distal end of the femur, and a wide longitudinal groove present along the distal third of the dorsal surface of the third metatarsal.

== Description ==
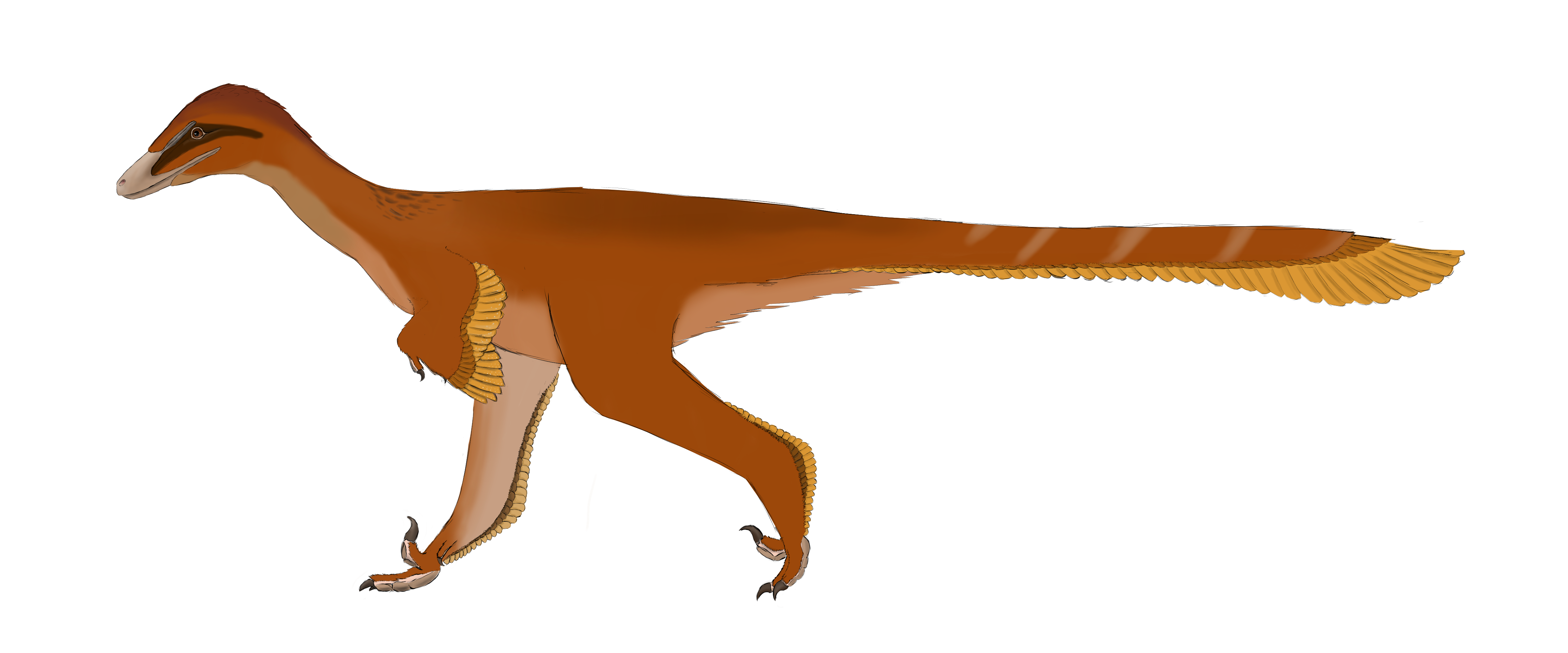
Life restoration

Linhevenator is a troodontid, a group of small, bird-like, gracile maniraptorans. All troodontids have many unique features of the skull, such as closely spaced teeth in the lower jaw, and large numbers of teeth. Troodontids have sickle-claws and raptorial hands, and some of the highest non-avian encephalization quotients, meaning they were behaviourally advanced and had keen senses. Linhevenator is a rather large troodontid with an estimated body weight of 23 kg (51 lb), with a length of 1.9 to 2.7 meters (6.2 to 8.9 ft) with an average of 2.2 metres (7.2 feet), based on allometric scaling from Byronosaurus, Stenonychosaurus, and Zanabazar. The arms are relatively short but the humerus is very robust. The describers suggest the arm might have been used for digging or climbing. The first toe was preserved in a lateral position, instead of pointing forwards. Linhevenator has a dromaeosaurid-like pedal digit II, carrying a sickle-claw larger than that of basal troodontids.

== Classification ==
Linhevenator was assigned to the Troodontidae by the describers. It possesses a combination of "primitive" (basal) and derived characters, but was found to be a derived troodontid in a phylogenetic analysis, in a polytomy with Troodon and a clade formed by Zanabazar and Saurornithoides. This position was seen by the authors as an indication for an evolutionary trend in the Troodontidae of shortening the forelimbs and for a parallel evolution of large sickle-claws with both the troodontids and the dromaeosaurids.

== See also ==
- Timeline of troodontid research
