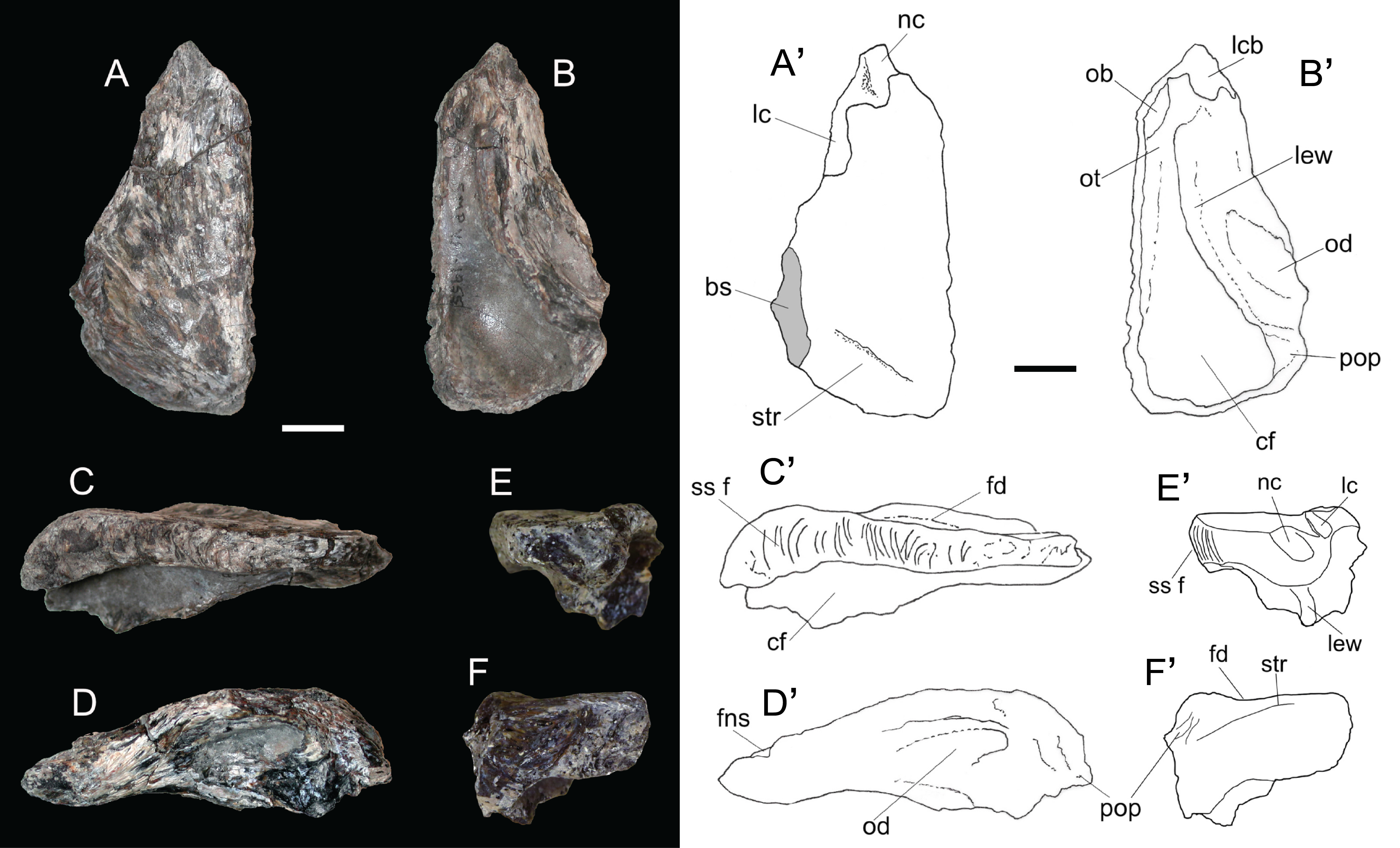
- Photographs (left) and line drawings (right) of the holotype frontal

Scientific classification
- Kingdom: Animalia
- Phylum: Chordata
- Class: Reptilia
- Clade: Dinosauria
- Clade: Saurischia
- Clade: Theropoda
- Family: †Troodontidae
- Subfamily: †Troodontinae
- Clade: †Troodontini
- Genus: †Dinevenator; Jasinski & Sullivan, 2026

Type species
- †Saurornitholestes robustus Sullivan, 2006

= Dinevenator =

Dinevenator Temporal range: Late Cretaceous (late Campanian), ~75–73.5 Ma

Genus of theropod dinosaur

Dinevenator (lit. 'Diné hunter') is an extinct genus of troodontid theropod dinosaur known from the Late Cretaceous (Campanian age) Kirtland Formation of New Mexico, United States. The type species of the genus, Dinevenator robustus, is known from a nearly complete frontal bone (a skull roof bone). Previous work had assigned it to the genera Saurornitholestes and Xenovenator.

== Discovery and naming ==
In 2006, Robert M. Sullivan described a left frontal bone found during the summer of 2005 in the Kirtland Formation (De-na-zin Member) of the San Juan Basin in New Mexico, United States. Permanently accessioned as SMP VP-1955 in the State Museum of Pennsylvania in Harrisburg, Pennsylvania, United States, Sullivan assigned it to the new species Saurornitholestes robustus. The specific name, robustus, referred to its robust build compared to other dromaeosaurids, which the specimen was originally considered to represent. However, Alan H. Turner and colleagues considered this taxon as a possible nomen dubium (dubious name) in 2012, while David C. Evans and colleagues found in 2014 that the specimen actually represented an indeterminate troodontid, and thus was not referrable to the genus Saurornitholestes.

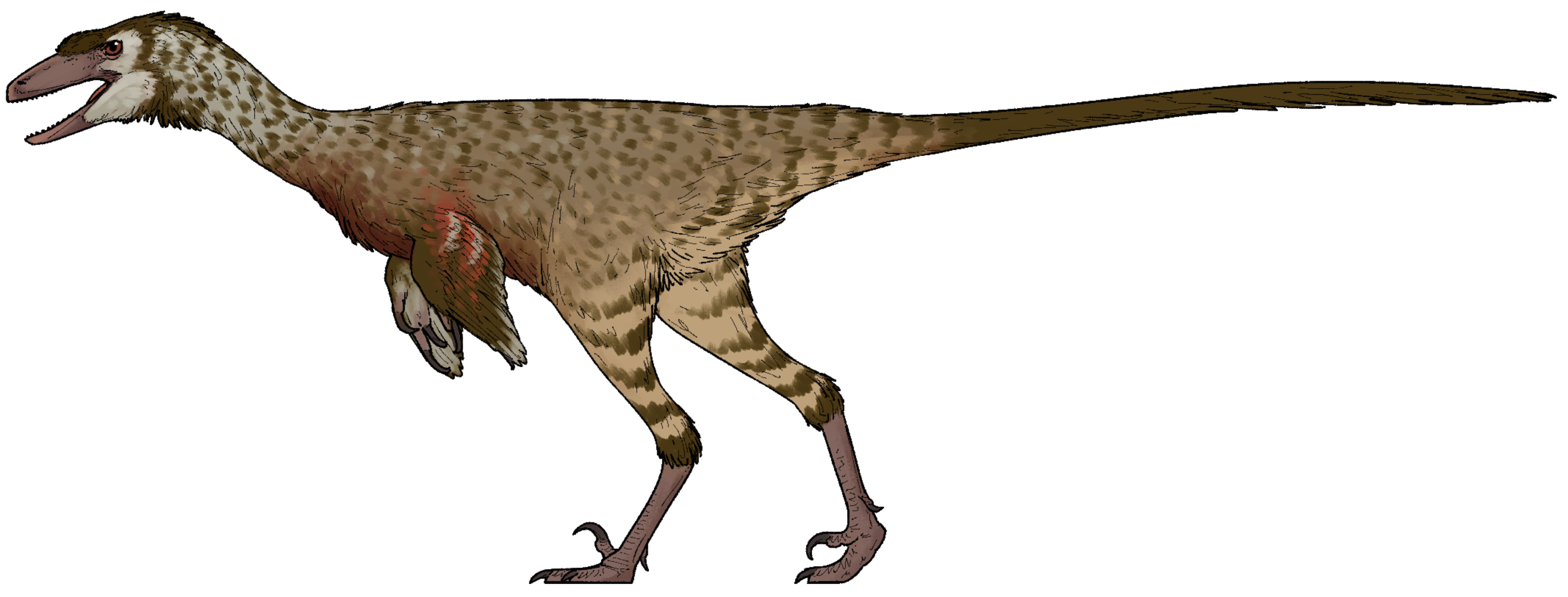
Life restoration

In 2026, Hector E. Rivera-Sylva and colleagues tentatively assigned "S." robustus to their new genus Xenovenator, creating the new combination X.? robustus, based on anatomical characteristics shared with the type species of that genus, X. espinosai. Later that year, Steven E. Jasinski and Robert M. Sullivan redescribed SMP VP-1955, reinterpreting it as belonging to a distinct genus, which they named Dinevenator. The generic name, Dinevenator, honors the Diné (or Navajo) people of the American Southwest, where the fossil was found, combined with the Latin word venator, meaning 'hunter'.

== Classification ==
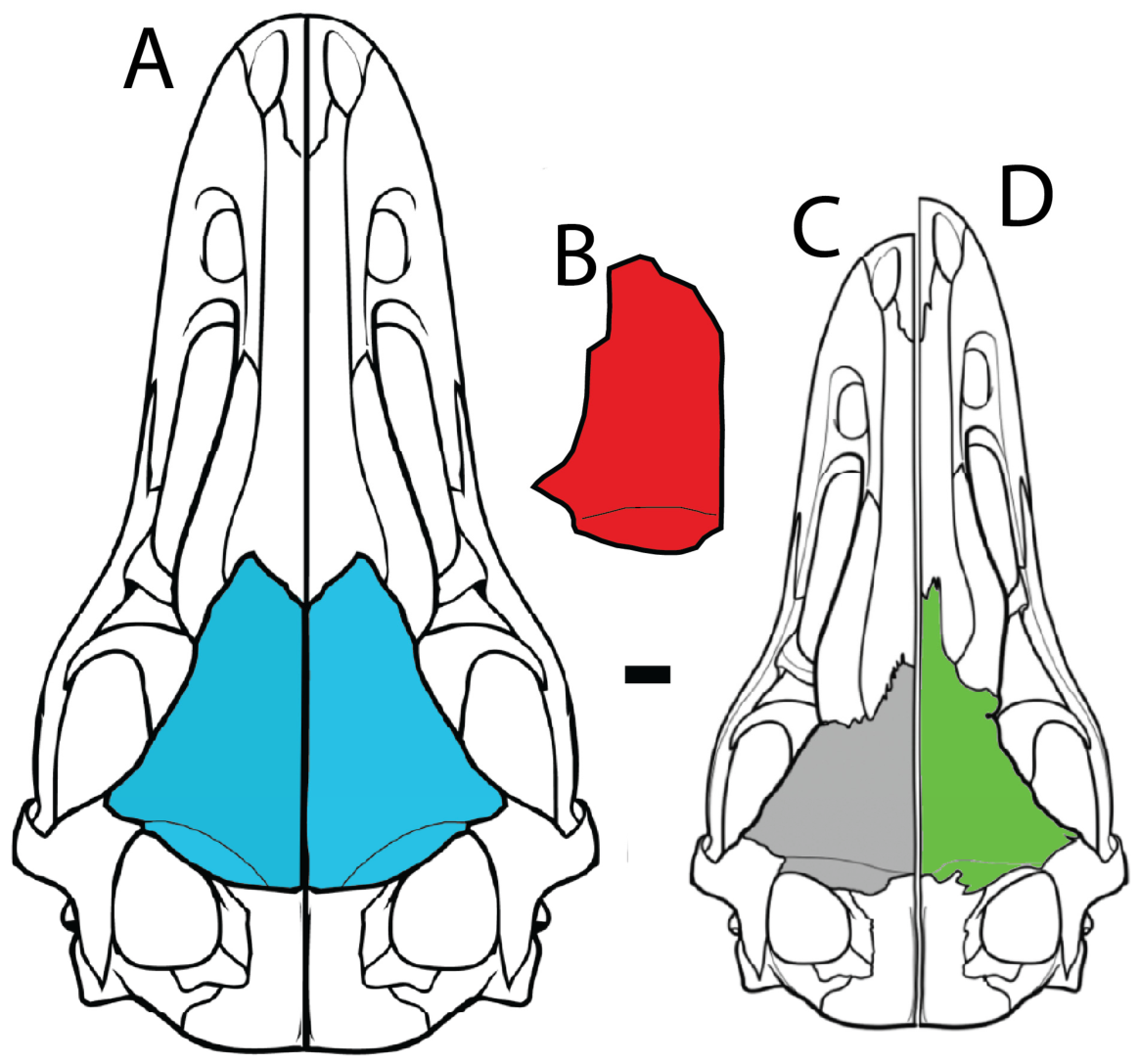
Comparison of four troodontin frontal bones (to scale), including Dinevenator in blue (A) and Xenovenator in red (B).

For their 2026 description of Xenovenator, Rivera-Sylva et al. (2026) constructed a novel phylogenetic dataset to test the interrelationships of the Troodontidae. Xenovenator was recovered in a late-diverging position within the more exclusive clade Troodontinae. D. robustus (then X.? robustus) was recovered as the sister taxon to X. espinosai, with Albertavenator as the sister to these taxa. A clade comprising Troodon, Stenonychosaurus, Latenivenatrix, and an unnamed specimen from the Kaiparowits Formation was recovered as the sister group to Xenovenator + Albertavenator, forming the newly-named clade Troodontini. These results are displayed in the cladogram below:

- Troodontidae
  - Sinovenator changii
  - - Jianianhualong tengi
    - - Mei long
      - - Daliansaurus liaoningensis
        - Sinornithoides youngi
        - Sinusonasus magnodens
        - Khamareen Us troodontid
        - - - Harenadraco prima
            - Philovenator curriei
          - - Hypnovenator matsubaraetoheorum
            - - Almas ukhaa
              - - Papiliovenator neimengguensis
                - - Byronosaurus jaffei
                  - - Urbacodon itemirensis
                    - - - Gobivenator mongoliensis
                        - Xixiasaurus henanensis
                      - - Linhevenator tani
                        - Troodontinae
                          - Saurornithoidini
                            ⊞
                            - Borogovia gracilicrus
                            - Saurornithoides mongoliensis
                            - Talos sampsoni
                            - Zanabazar junior
                            ⊟
                          - Troodontini
                            - - Troodon formosus
                              - - Kaiparowits troodontid
                                - - Stenonychosaurus inequalis
                                  - Latenivenatrix mcmasterae
                            - - Albertavenator curriei
                              - - Xenovenator? robustus
                                - Xenovenator espinosai

In their 2026 redescription of "S." (or X.?) robustus as the new genus Dinevenator, Jasinski & Sullivan updated the character scores for this taxon and Albertavenator. When only analyzing the Troodontini subset of this phylogenetic matrix with Archaeopteryx as an outgroup, a slightly different tree topology was recovered. Dinevenator was placed as the basalmost member of the "robust forms" subclade of Troodontini, rather than as the sister to X. espinosai. The remaining troodontins aside from Albertaventor were regarded as forming a "gracile forms" subclade. These results are displayed in the cladogram below:

- Troodontini
  - - Troodon formosus
    - - Latenivenatrix mcmasterae
      - - Kaiparowits troodontid
        - Stenonychosaurus inequalis
  - - Dinevenator robustus
    - - Albertavenator curriei
      - Xenovenator espinosai
