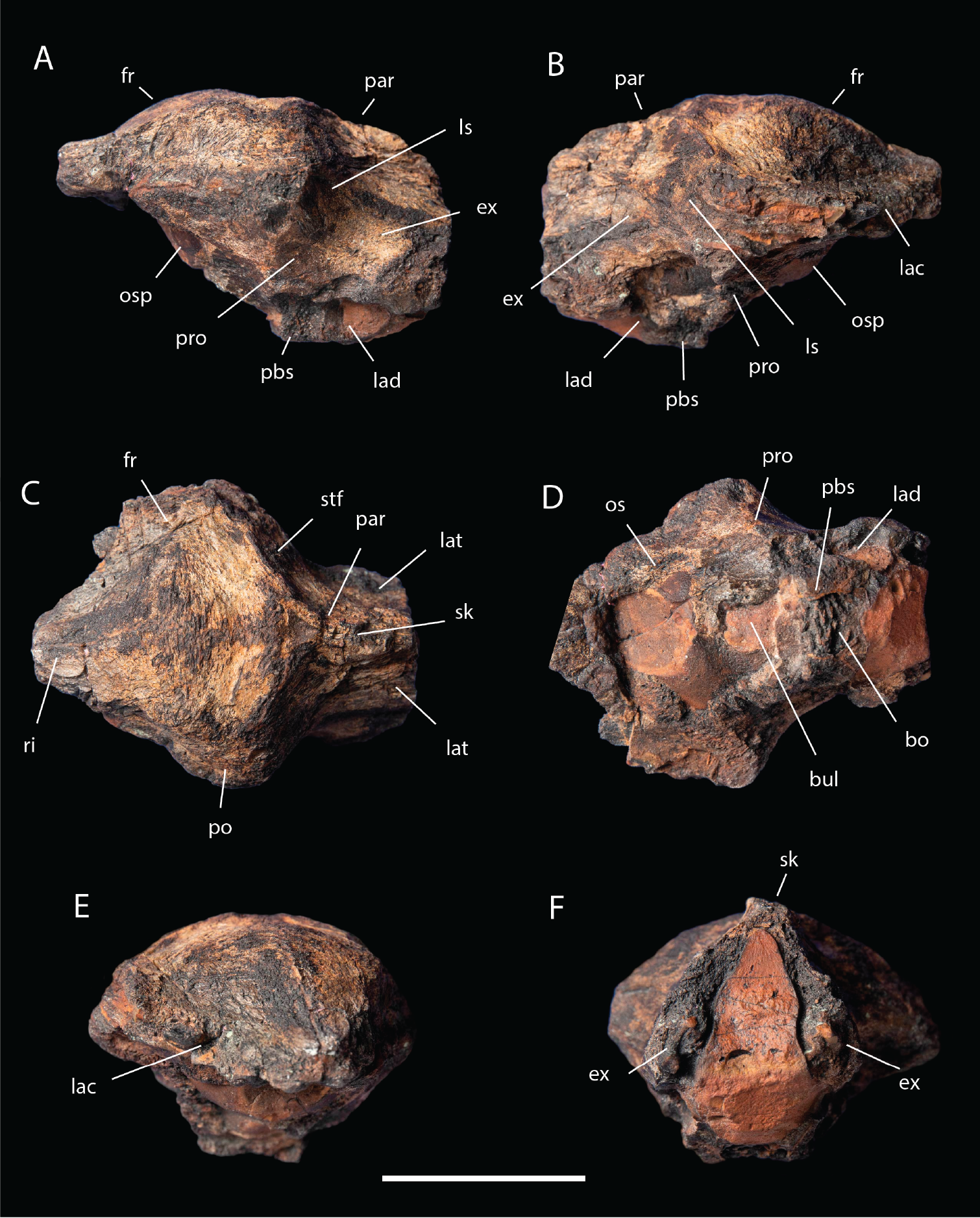
- Holotype of X. espinosai

Scientific classification
- Kingdom: Animalia
- Phylum: Chordata
- Class: Reptilia
- Clade: Dinosauria
- Clade: Saurischia
- Clade: Theropoda
- Family: †Troodontidae
- Subfamily: †Troodontinae
- Clade: †Troodontini
- Genus: †Xenovenator; Rivera-Sylva et al., 2026

Type species
- †Xenovenator espinosai Rivera-Sylva et al., 2026

= Xenovenator =

Xenovenator Temporal range: Late Cretaceous (late Campanian), ~74–72 Ma

Genus of theropod dinosaurs

Xenovenator (lit. 'strange hunter') is an extinct genus of troodontid theropod dinosaurs known from the Late Cretaceous (Campanian age) of North America. The type species of the genus, Xenovenator espinosai, is known from fragmentary skull bones found in the Cerro del Pueblo Formation of Mexico. It is characterized by an unusually expanded and rugose skull roof, somewhat comparable to that seen in pachycephalosaurs. This may imply Xenovenator individuals engaged in combat with other members of their species, a behavior for which adaptations had not been previously observed in non-avian paravians.

"Saurornitholestes" robustus, known from the Kirtland Formation of New Mexico, United States, was tentatively placed in this genus by Rivera-Sylva and colleagues in their 2026 description of Xenovenator, although it lacks the characteristic domed skull roof of X. espinosai. Later that year, Jasinski & Sullivan placed X.? robustus in a new genus, Dinevenator.

== Discovery and naming ==
During fieldwork in the Cerro del Pueblo Formation (La Parrita locality) in Coahuila, Mexico, in the summer of 2000, (Note: Reported as the field season of March 2007 by Aguillón-Martínez & Rivera-Sylva (2023)) Martha C. Aguillón-Martinez collected the partial skull of a theropod dinosaur. This specimen, comprising a partial skull roof (frontals, parietals) and braincase (orbitosphenoids, laterosphenoids, exoccipitals, prootics, basisphenoid, and basioccipital) was accessioned at the Museo del Desierto as specimen CPC 2973. In 2023, Aguillón-Martínez described CPC 2973 in collaboration with Héctor E. Rivera-Sylva. The authors explained that the partial skull represents the first non-tooth fossil material of a troodontid described from Mexico, but regarded it as an indeterminate member of the family, without naming it.

Additional fragmentary troodontid skull bones were later recovered from the Cerro del Pueblo Formation; CPC 2976, a left frontal, was also collected by Aguillón-Martinez during fieldwork at the La Parrita locality in summer 2004. CPC 3112, a right frontal, was collected by another worker in 2002 from the Ejido Trincheras locality and donated to the Museo del Desierto anonymously afterward.

In 2026, Rivera-Sylva and colleagues described Xenovenator espinosai as a new genus and species of troodontid dinosaurs based on these fossil remains, establishing CPC 2973 as the holotype specimen. CPC 2976 and 3112 were also referred to the species. The generic name, Xenovenator, combines the Greek word xenos, meaning 'strange', with the Latin venator, meaning 'hunter'. The specific name, espinosai, honors Mexican paleontologist and researcher Luis Espinosa.

In their description of Xenovenator, Rivera-Sylva et al. (2026) also reassessed SMP VP-1955, a right frontal previously placed in the dromaeosaurid genus Saurornitholestes as S. robustus. In 2006, Robert M. Sullivan described this specimen, found in the Kirtland Formation (De-na-zin Member) of San Juan Basin in New Mexico, United States. Based on anatomical characters shared with X. espinosai, Rivera-Sylva et al. tentatively assigned "S." robustus to their new genus Xenovenator, creating the new combination X.? robustus. Later that year, Steven E. Jasinski and Robert Sullivan redescribed SMP VP-1955, reinterpreting it as belonging to a distinct genus, which they named Dinevenator.

== Description and paleobiology ==
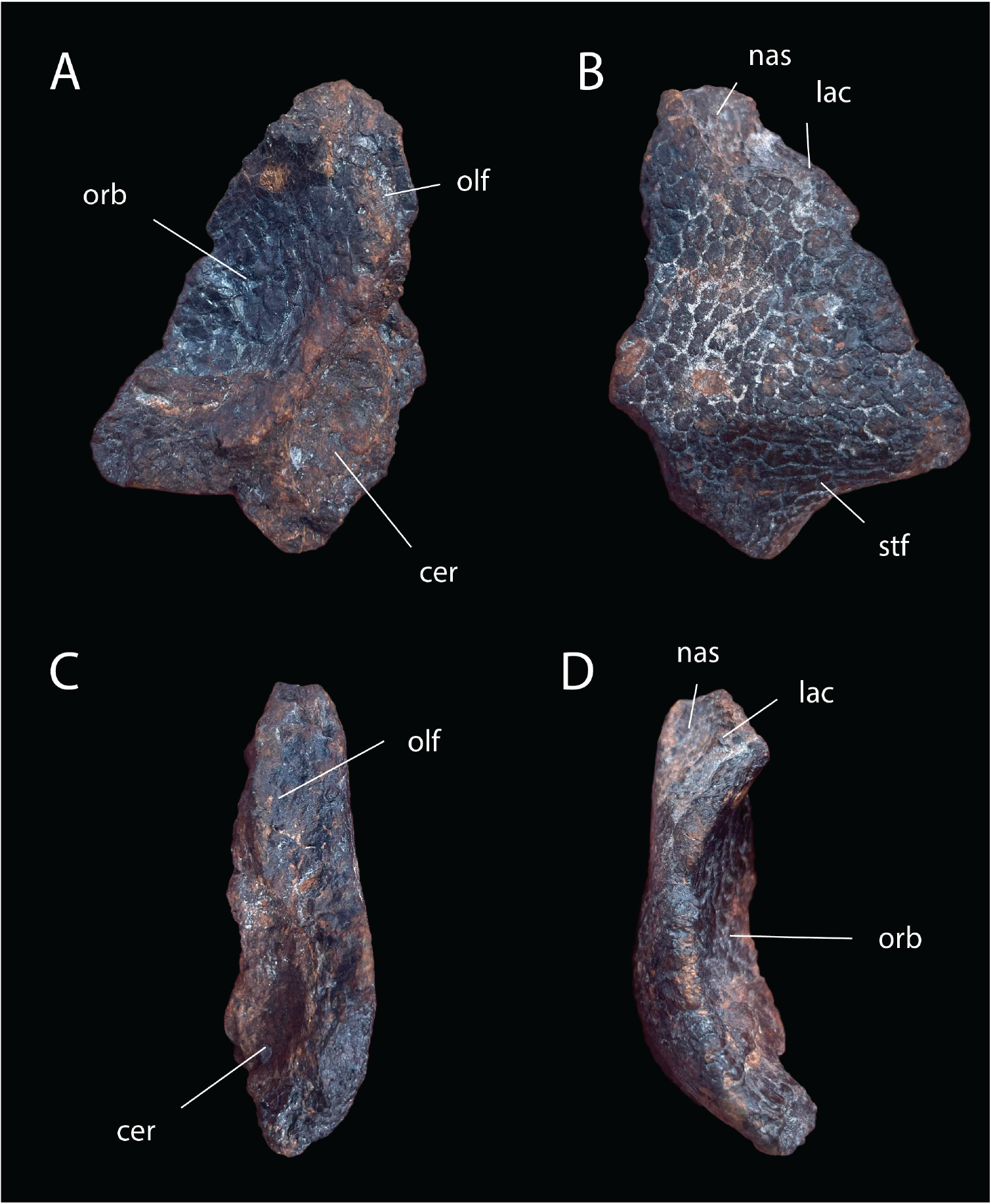
CPC 3112, a frontal bone referred to X. espinosai

The preserved cranial bones of Xenovenator indicate that the cranium bore a thickened dome formed by the frontal bones. The sutures between individual skull bones are tightly interlocking, forming prominent zig-zag patterns between bones. Furthermore, the surface of the skull bears a rugose texture over the dome. This combination of characters is consistent with the anatomy of animals that are known or speculated to use their skull for intraspecific combat (competition between members of the same species). The referred specimens of X. espinosai lack some of the distinctive characters of the holotype, including the strongly domed and fused frontals and tightly interlocking bones, despite sharing several other autapomorphies (unique derived traits). Rivera-Sylva et al. (2026) interpreted this as possible evidence of ontogenetic variation, with the dome expanding and fusing as the animal matured. An alternative proposed explanation is sexual dimorphism, an occurrence not well-documented in non-avian dinosaurs but common in extant mammals and birds. In this instance, one sex might not develop a dome, or develop one at a different ontogenetic stage. This is supported by the size of CPC 2976 (a referred frontal), nearly equally that of the holotype, despite lacking a dome. X.? robustus lacks the distinctively domed skull roof of X. espinosai, instead having weakly arched frontals. This may indicate it is a juvenile or female, or it may be a genuine distinction at the specific level.

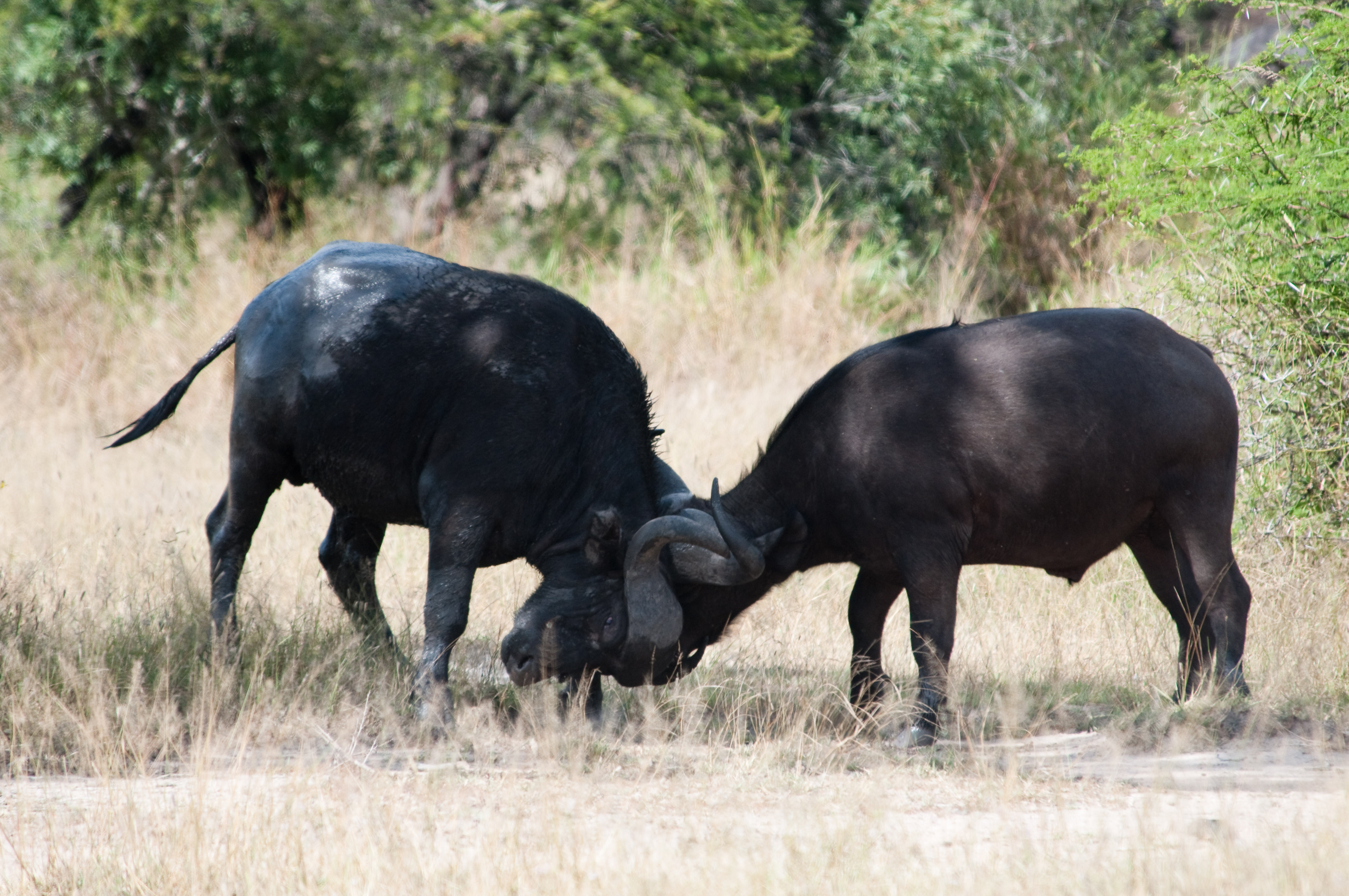
Intraspecific combat in two male cape buffalo (Syncerus caffer)

The function and purpose of a dome in a troodontid is unclear, although comparisons with living animals suggest some possibilities. Some birds have expanded frontals, including magpie geese and goldeneyes, and some helmeted hornbills are known to fly at each other, ramming their casques together. Mammals with domed crania include giraffes, muskoxen, and cape buffalo, all of which engage in head-butting. Dinosaurs with domes and bosses include pachycephalosaurs, Pachyrhinosaurus (a ceratopsian), and the fellow theropods Majungasaurus and Sauroniops. The structure and method of cranial thickening in Xenovenator is most similar to pachycephalosaurids despite being relatively thinner. The low profile of the dome in Xenovenator and extreme thickness of the bone suggest it did not simply serve as a display structure. The elaborate sutures and internal cranial architecture may both be adaptations for ramming, with the dense arrangement of trabeculae being comparable to conditions in hornbills. The rugosity of the skull roof is similar to that seen in steamer ducks and helmeted hornbills, as well as the aforementioned mammals. As such, it may be an adaptation to reduce stress, prevent fractures, or anchor larger soft tissue structures. If the identity of the dome as an intraspecific combat adaptation is supported, this would be the first such instance known in a non-bird paravian dinosaur. Similar rugosity in other troodontines may imply combative behavior in other species, though not to the degree seen in Xenovenator.

== Classification ==
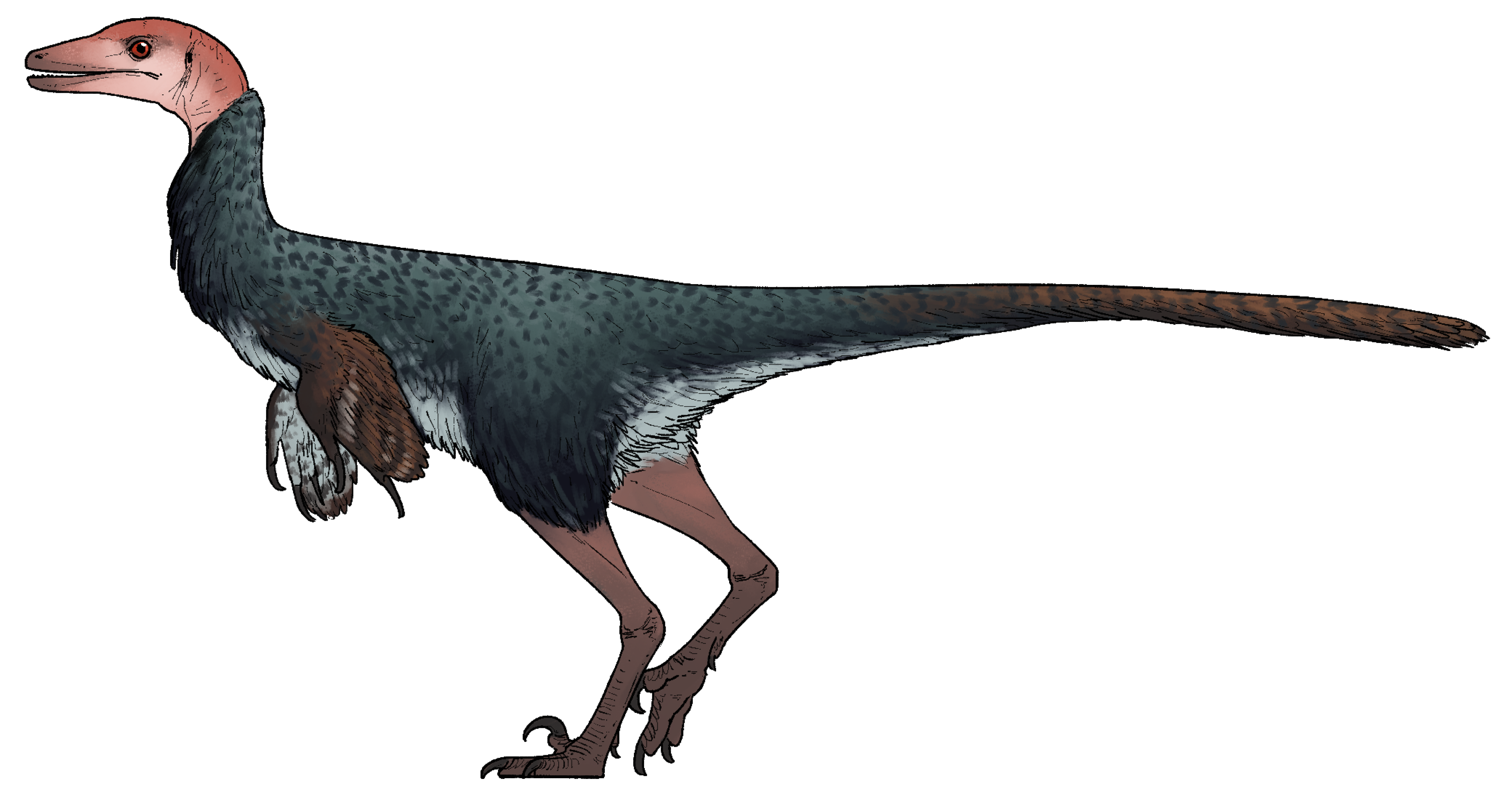
Speculative life restoration

For their 2026 description of Xenovenator, Rivera-Sylva et al. (2026) constructed a novel phylogenetic dataset to test the interrelationships of the Troodontidae. Xenovenator was recovered in a late-diverging position within the more exclusive clade Troodontinae. X.? robustus was recovered as the sister taxon to X. espinosai, in turn sister to Albertavenator. A clade comprising Troodon, Stenonychosaurus, Latenivenatrix, and an unnamed specimen from the Kaiparowits Formation was recovered as the sister group to Xenovenator + Albertavenator, forming the newly-named clade Troodontini. These results are displayed in the cladogram below:

- Troodontidae
  - Sinovenator changii
  - - Jianianhualong tengi
    - - Mei long
      - - Daliansaurus liaoningensis
        - Sinornithoides youngi
        - Sinusonasus magnodens
        - Khamareen Us troodontid
        - - - Harenadraco prima
            - Philovenator curriei
          - - Hypnovenator matsubaraetoheorum
            - - Almas ukhaa
              - - Papiliovenator neimengguensis
                - - Byronosaurus jaffei
                  - - Urbacodon itemirensis
                    - - - Gobivenator mongoliensis
                        - Xixiasaurus henanensis
                      - - Linhevenator tani
                        - Troodontinae
                          - Saurornithoidini
                            ⊞
                            - Borogovia gracilicrus
                            - Saurornithoides mongoliensis
                            - Talos sampsoni
                            - Zanabazar junior
                            ⊟
                          - Troodontini
                            - - Troodon formosus
                              - - Kaiparowits troodontid
                                - - Stenonychosaurus inequalis
                                  - Latenivenatrix mcmasterae
                            - - Albertavenator curriei
                              - - Xenovenator? robustus
                                - Xenovenator espinosai

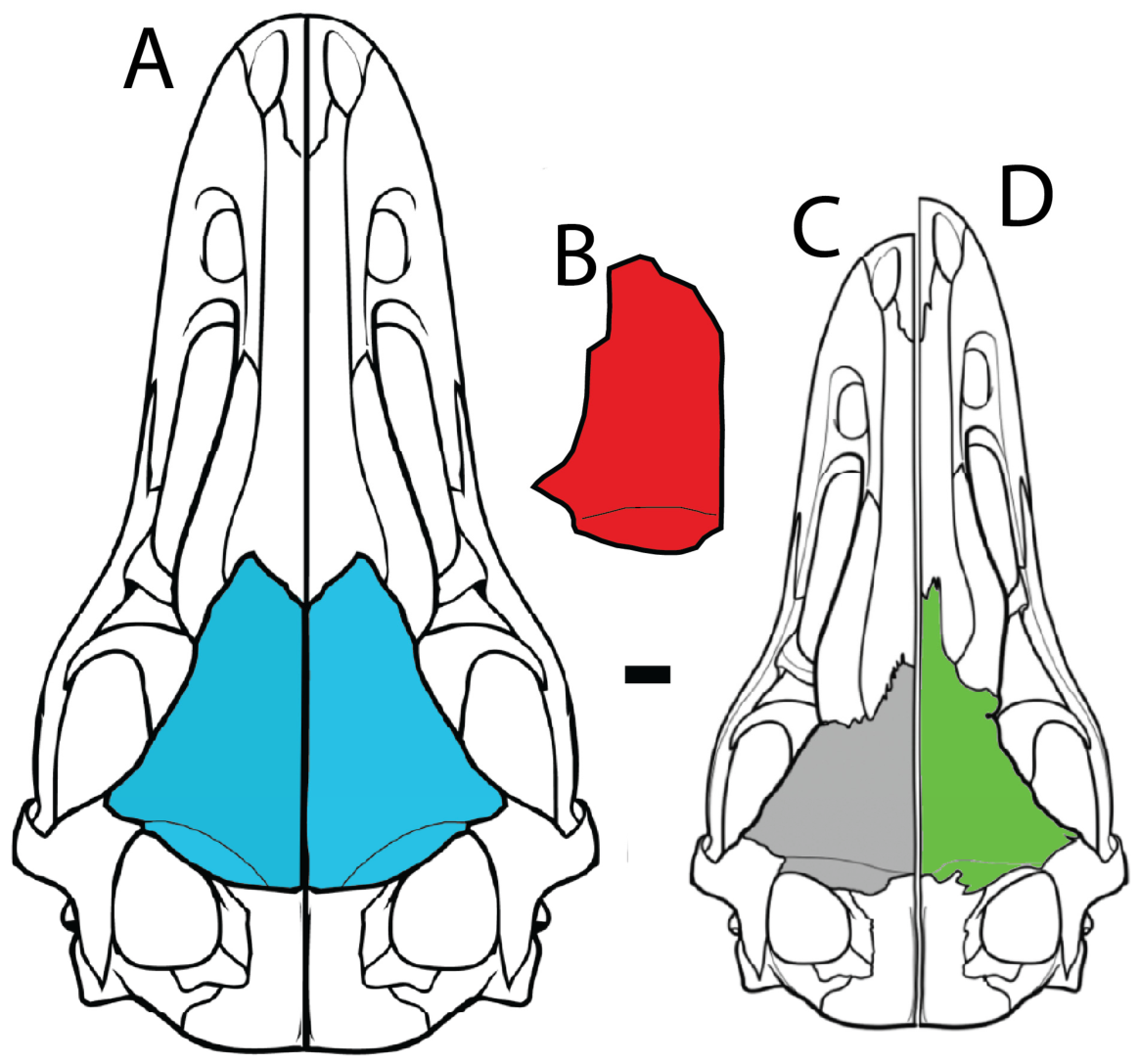
Comparison of four troodontin frontal bones (to scale), including Dinevenator in blue (A) and Xenovenator in red (B).

In their 2026 redescription of "S." (or X.?) robustus as the new genus Dinevenator, Jasinski & Sullivan updated the character scores for this taxon and Albertavenator. When only analyzing the Troodontini subset of this phylogenetic matrix with Archaeopteryx as an outgroup, a slightly different tree topology was recovered. Dinevenator was placed as the basalmost member of the "robust forms" subclade of Troodontini, rather than as the sister to X. espinosai. The remaining troodontins aside from Albertaventor were regarded as forming a "gracile forms" subclade. These results are displayed in the cladogram below:

- Troodontini
  - - Troodon formosus
    - - Latenivenatrix mcmasterae
      - - Kaiparowits troodontid
        - Stenonychosaurus inequalis
  - - Dinevenator robustus
    - - Albertavenator curriei
      - Xenovenator espinosai
