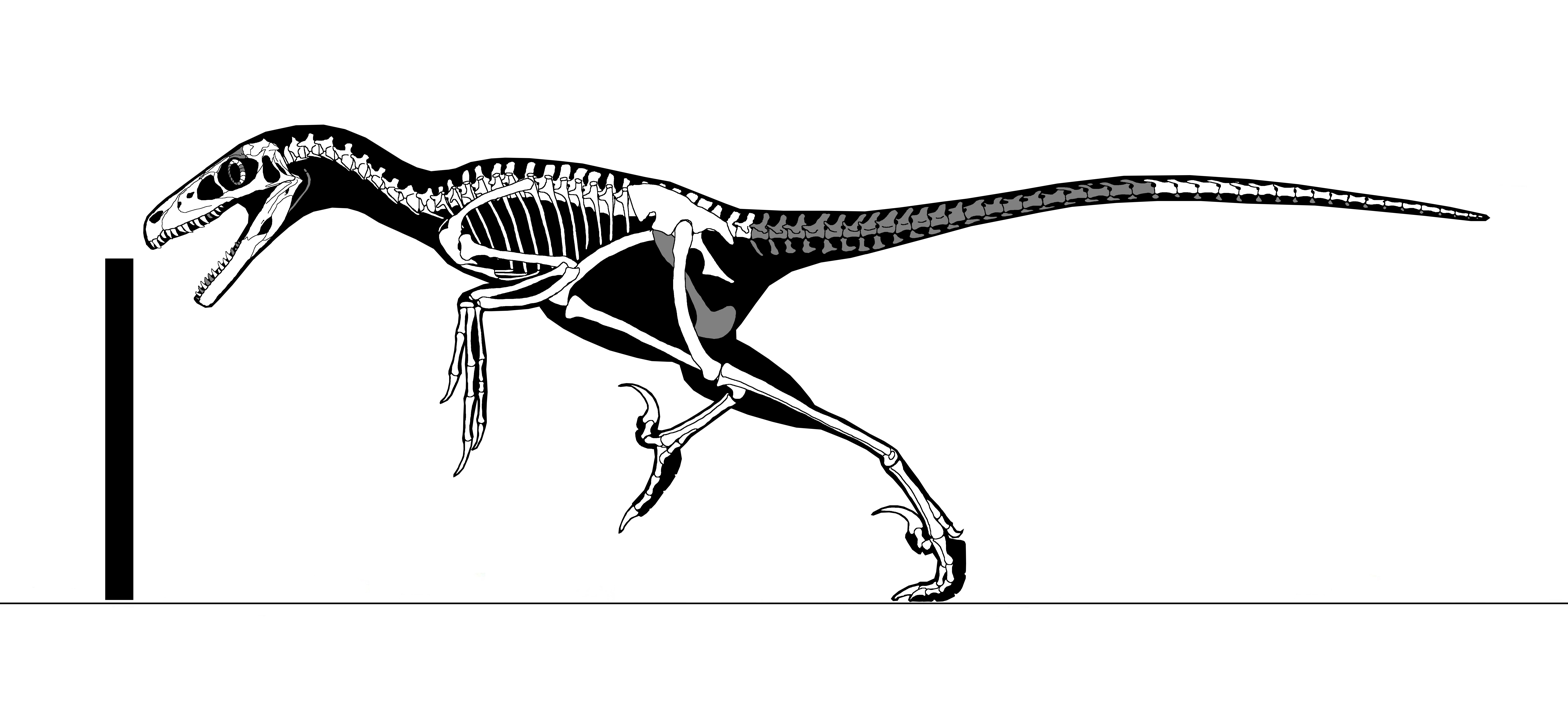
- Skeletal reconstruction of S. langstoni

Scientific classification
- Kingdom: Animalia
- Phylum: Chordata
- Class: Reptilia
- Clade: Dinosauria
- Clade: Saurischia
- Clade: Theropoda
- Family: †Dromaeosauridae
- Clade: †Eudromaeosauria
- Subfamily: †Saurornitholestinae
- Genus: †Saurornitholestes; Sues, 1978

Type species
- †Saurornitholestes langstoni Sues, 1978

Other species
- †S. sullivani Jasinski, 2015

Synonyms
- Bambiraptor? Burnham et al., 2000

= Saurornitholestes =

Saurornitholestes Temporal range: Late Cretaceous, 83.6–66 Ma Possible Cretaceous-Paleogene boundary record

Extinct genus of theropod dinosaurs

Saurornitholestes ("lizard-bird thief") is a genus of carnivorous dromaeosaurid theropod dinosaur from the late Cretaceous of Canada (Alberta and Saskatchewan) and the United States (Montana, New Mexico, Alabama, and South Carolina). Two species have been named that are regarded as valid: Saurornitholestes langstoni in 1978 and Saurornitholestes sullivani in 2015. Saurornitholestes was a small, bipedal, meat-eating dinosaur, equipped with a sickle-like claw on each foot.

Saurornitholestes robustus, a species named in 2006, was regarded as a dubious troodontid in 2014, tentatively assigned to the genus Xenovenator in early 2026, and assigned to its own genus, Dinevenator later in 2026.

== Discovery and naming ==
In 1974, Canadian amateur paleontologist Irene Vanderloh discovered the skeleton of a small theropod near Steveville in Alberta. She showed it to John Storer of the Provincial Museum of Alberta, who brought it to the attention of Hans-Dieter Sues. In 1978, Sues named and described the specimen as the type species Saurornitholestes langstoni. The generic name is in reference to the Saurornithoididae, due to the resemblance with this group that is today seen as part of the Troodontidae, and combines their name with a Greek lestes, "thief". The specific name honours Wann Langston, Jr.

The holotype specimen, TMP 1974.10.5, was uncovered in a layer of the Dinosaur Park Formation dating to the late Campanian. It consists of a very fragmentary skeleton including teeth, skull elements, two vertebrae, ribs, tail elements and a part of the hand. Also three paratypes were assigned: CMN 12343, CMN 12354, and UA 5283, all frontals.

=== Additional specimens ===
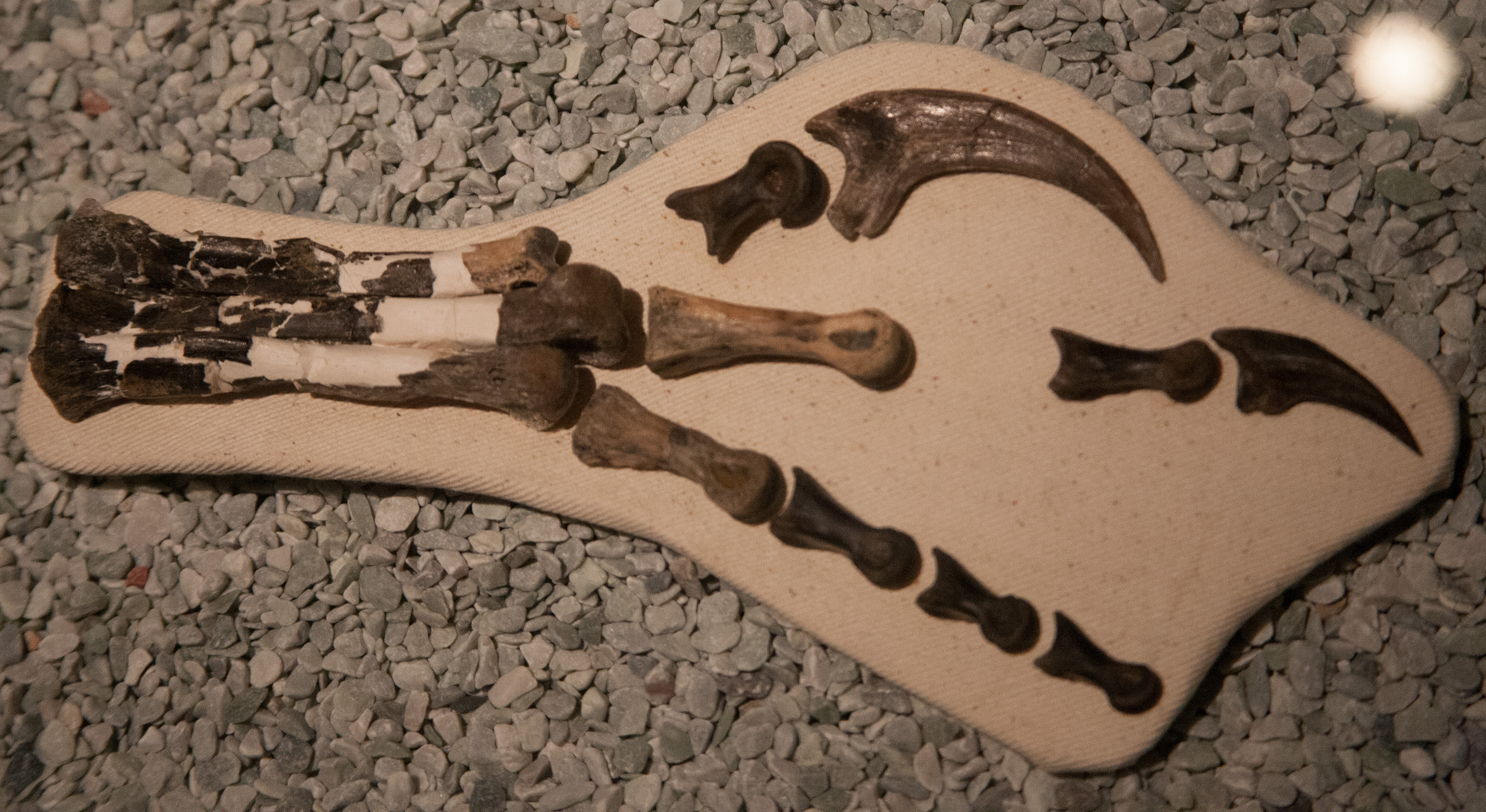
Foot of an assigned S. langstoni specimen

Two more complete and larger partial skeletons (RTMP 88.121.39 and MOR 660), dozens of isolated bones, and scores of teeth are known from the badlands of Dinosaur Provincial Park in Alberta; most of these are housed at the Royal Tyrrell Museum of Palaeontology, in Drumheller, Alberta and remain undescribed. The Alberta and Montana remains are usually attributed to the single species Saurornitholestes langstoni, though they come from a variety of rock formations indicating a wide span of time; for example, the Oldman Formation (dated to about 77 million years ago) and the upper Two Medicine Formation (about 72 million years ago). Similar teeth are found in younger deposits, dated to around 70 to 69 million years ago, but whether they represent S. langstoni or a different, related species is unknown. Neonate-sized Saurornitholestes fossils have been reported in the scientific literature.

Fragmentary fossils of Saurornitholestes are also known from the eastern half of North America, which formed the landmass of Appalachia during the Late Cretaceous. A tooth found in the Mooreville Chalk of Alabama has been assigned to the genus. In 2015, Schwimmer et al. identified the existence of Saurornitholestes langstoni from the Coachman and Donoho Creek formations of South Carolina based on diagnostic teeth and a pedal ungual. This also makes S. langstoni currently the only dromaeosaurid taxon reported with certainty from the East Coast.

Saurornitholestes sullivani is known from the Hunter Wash fauna of the Kirtland Formation in New Mexico, based on the frontal SMP VP-1270. It differs from S. langstoni in the characters of the frontal.

A well-preserved skeleton of Saurornitholestes (specimen UALVP 55700) discovered in 2014 is currently under preparation by University of Alberta paleontologists working in Japan. After examining the skull of that specimen, Currie and Evans announced in 2019 that the Zapsalis teeth from the Dinosaur Park Formation represented the second premaxillary tooth of S. langstoni.

=== Formerly assigned species ===
In 2006, Robert Sullivan named and described a second nominal species, Saurornitholestes robustus, based on holotype SMP VP-1955, a left frontal. The specific name refers to the great thickness of this bone, the only trait in which the species is known to differ from S. langstoni. The holotype was found in the Willow Wash fauna of the Kirtland Formation in New Mexico, dated to about 73 million years ago. However, a subsequent overview of dromaeosaurid phylogeny asserted that S. robustus lacked dromaeosaurid characters and should be considered an indeterminate theropod, and a study published in 2014 took the conclusion a step further by demonstrating that S. robustus was assignable to Troodontidae based on similarities with troodontids. In 2026, Rivera-Sylva and colleagues tentatively assigned S. robustus to their new genus Xenovenator based on shared cranial anatomy, a conclusion supported by their phylogenetic analyses. Later that year, Steven E. Jasinski and Robert Sullivan redescribed SMP VP-1955, reinterpreting it as belonging to a distinct genus, which they named Dinevenator.

Possible indeterminate fossils are known from the Hell Creek Formation in Montana, North Dakota, and South Dakota, dated to about 66 million years ago.

== Description ==
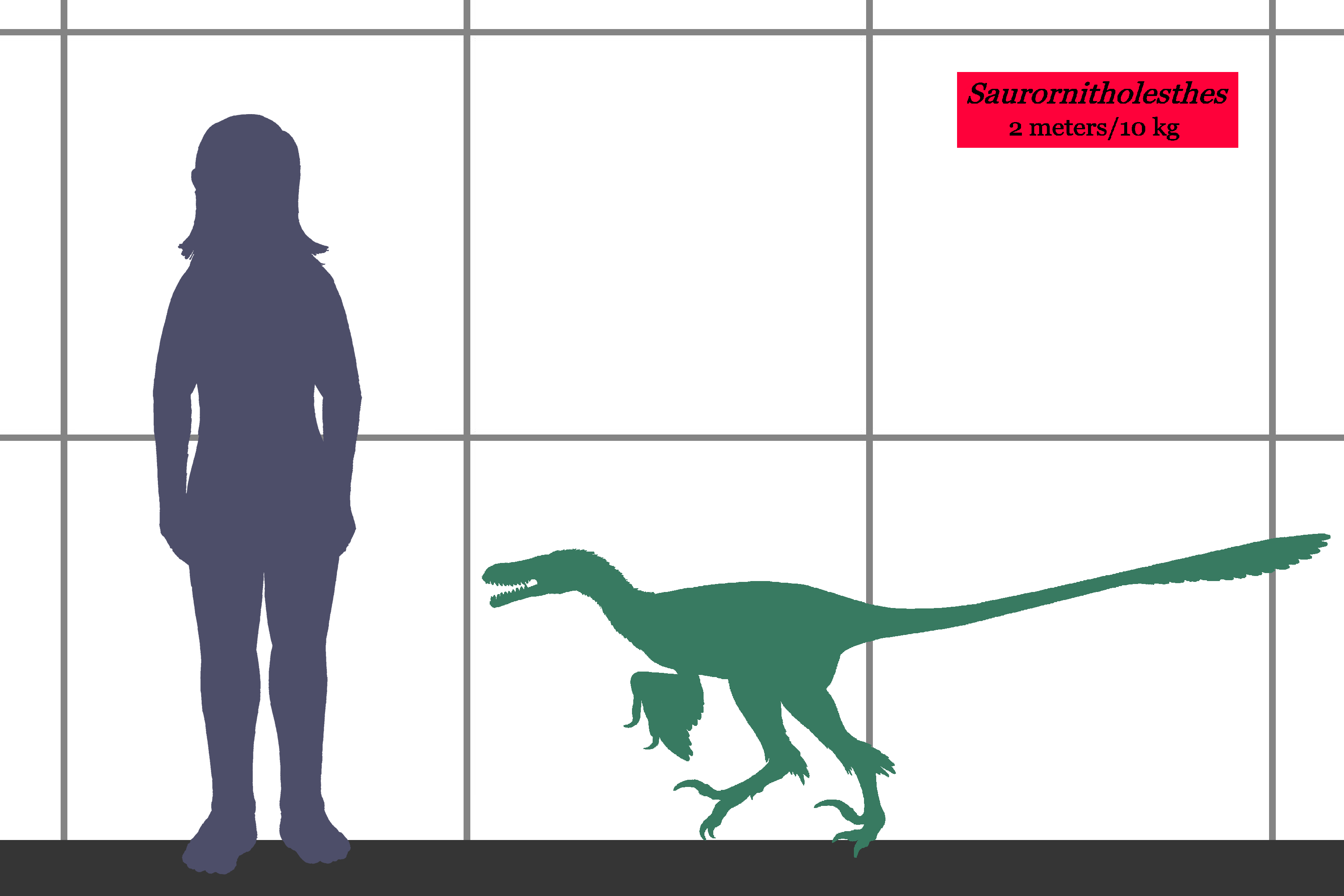
Size of S. langstoni compared to a human

Saurornitholestes was a small dromaeosaur, with the type species S. langstoni measuring about 1.3–1.8 m (4 ft 3 in – 5 ft 11 in) long and weighing approximately between 5 and 22.5 kg (11 and 50 lb). At the hip it stood 60 cm (2 ft) tall. Like other theropods in the Dromaeosauridae, Saurornitholestes had a long, curving, blade-like claw on the second toe. Saurornitholestes was more long-legged and lightly built than other dromaeosaurids such as Velociraptor and Dromaeosaurus. It resembles Velociraptor in having large, fanglike teeth in the front of the jaws. Saurornitholestes most closely resembles Velociraptor, although the precise relationships of the Dromaeosauridae are still relatively poorly understood.

== Classification ==
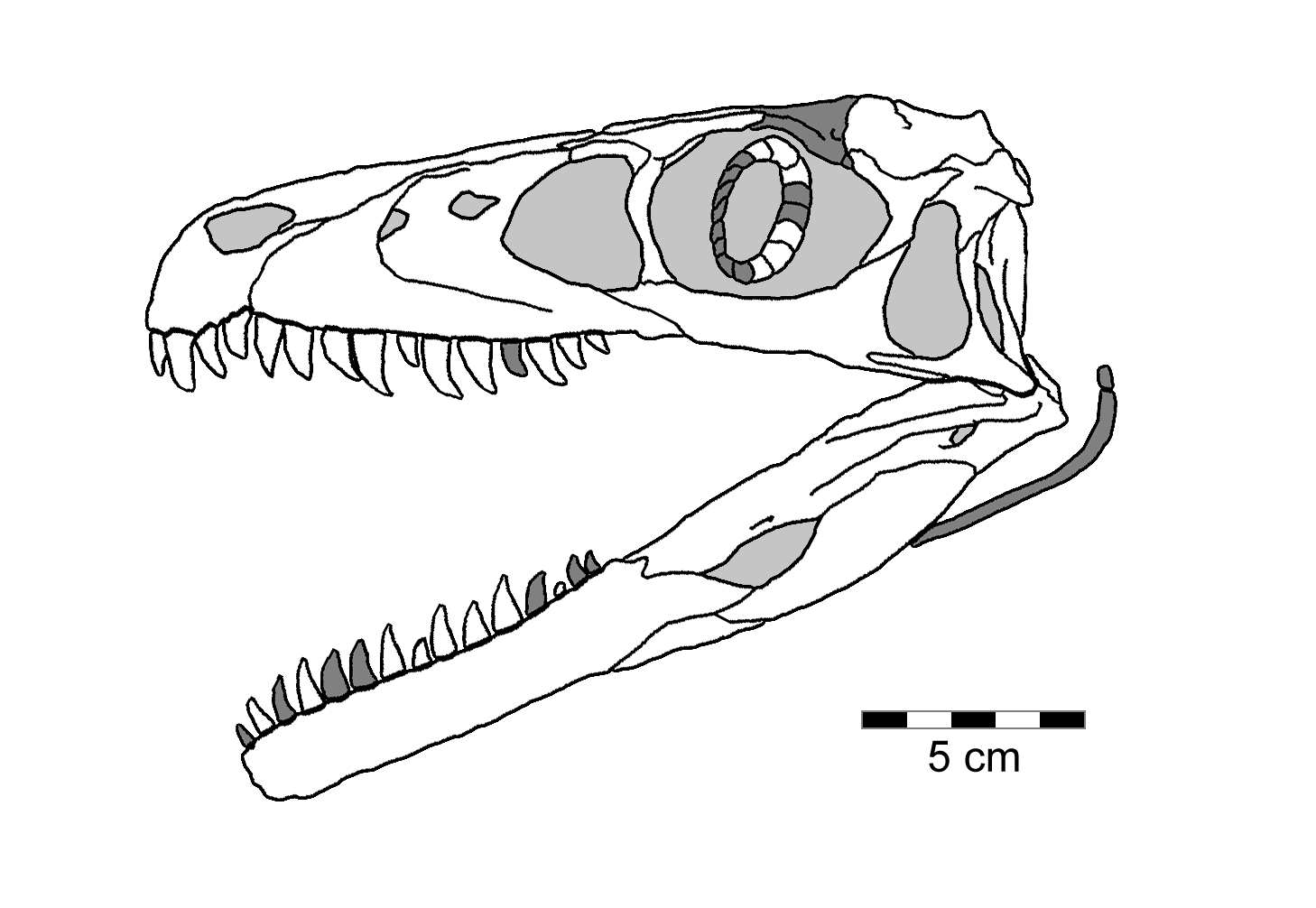
Reconstructed S. langstoni skull

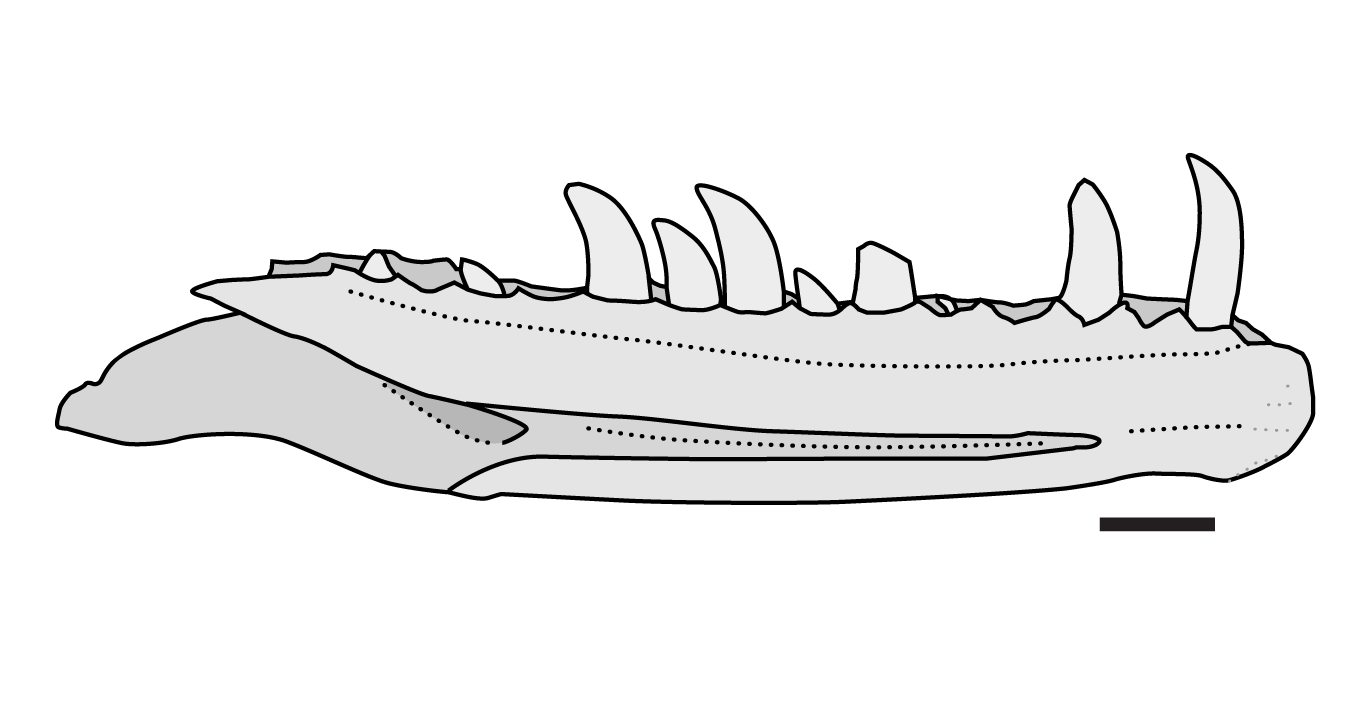
Dentary of S. langstoni specimen TMP 1988.121.0039

In 1978, Sues assigned Saurornitholestes to the Dromaeosauridae. Later studies most often found it a member of the dromaeosaurid Velociraptorinae, but a cladistic analysis by Philip J. Currie in 2009 recovered a position in a more basal dromaeosaurid clade that was named the Saurornitholestinae.

The cladogram below is the result of a 2019 analysis by Philip J. Currie and David C. Evans. Currie and Evans recovered Saurornitholestes as the sister taxon of Atrociraptor.

- Eudromaeosauria
  - Saurornitholestinae
    - Atrociraptor marshalli
    - Saurornitholestes langstoni
  - - Dromaeosaurinae
      - Dakotaraptor steini
      - - Baynshire Formation nov. sp.
        - Boreonykus certekorum
        - Dromaeosaurus albertensis
    - Velociraptorinae
      - Deinonychus antirrhopus
      - - - Adasaurus mongoliensis
          - - Achillobator giganticus
            - Utahraptor ostrommaysi
        - - Acheroraptor termeryorum
          - - Velociraptor mongoliensis
            - - Velociraptor osmolskae
              - - Linheraptor exquisitus
                - Tsaagan mangas

== Paleobiology ==
=== Senses ===
Saurornitholestes sullivani is thought to have had a keen sense of smell, due to its skull suggesting an unusually large olfactory bulb.

=== Teeth function ===
The second premaxillary teeth of (at least) Saurornitholestes, Velociraptor, and Bambiraptor may have been structurally specialized for preening feathers. This may also have been the function of the unusual premaxillary teeth of the oviraptorosaurs Protarchaeopteryx and Incisivosaurus.

=== Feeding habits ===
Restoration of S. langstoni

Saurornitholestes' feeding habits were discovered to be typical of coelurosaurian theropods, with a characteristic "puncture and pull" feeding method. Studies of wear patterns on the teeth of this animal by Angelica Torices et al. in a study regarding theropod feeding habits indicate that dromaeosaurid teeth share similar wear patterns to those seen in the Tyrannosauridae and Troodontidae, respectively. However, micro-wear on the teeth indicated that Saurornitholestes likely preferred larger prey items than the troodontids it shared their environment with. Such differentiations in its diet likely allowed the theropod to inhabit the same environment as its more distant maniraptoran relations. The same study also indicated that both Saurornitholestes and the related Dromaeosaurus (also analyzed in the study) likely included bone in their diet and were better adapted to handle the stresses associated with attacking struggling prey while troodontids, equipped with weaker jaws, preyed on softer animals and prey items such as invertebrates and carrion. This feeding strategy and ability to handle struggling prey was also a feature that these two dromaeosaurids shared with tyrannosaurids such as Gorgosaurus, which was also analyzed in said study alongside these smaller theropods.

A tooth of Saurornitholestes has been found embedded in the wing bone of a large pterosaur, possibly a juvenile Quetzalcoatlus. Because the pterosaur was so much larger than Saurornitholestes, Currie and Jacobsen suggest that the theropod was probably scavenging the remains of an already dead animal.

=== Paleopathology ===
In 2001, Bruce Rothschild and others published a study examining evidence for stress fractures and tendon avulsions in theropod dinosaurs and the implications for their behavior. They found that only two of the 82 Saurornitholestes foot bones checked for stress fractures actually had them. Two of the nine hand bones examined for stress fractures were found to have them.

Aase Roland Jacobsen published a description of a Saurornitholestes dentary in 2001. The dentary is about 12 cm long and preserves fifteen tooth positions, of which only ten preserve teeth. Three toothmarks were visible on the inner "lingual" surface of the dentary. Two of the three marks are series of grooves made by the serrations on the maker's teeth. The striations are between 0.37 mm and 0.40 mm thick with cuboidal cross-sections.

The shape of the preserved serrations are too different from those of Saurornitholestes for the marks to be the result of injuries incurred during intraspecific face biting behaviors. Although the right shape for Dromaeosaurus tooth serrations, the preserved marks are too coarse to have been left by that genus. Although a specific identification cannot be made, the most likely perpetrator would be a juvenile individual of one of the Dinosaur Park Formation's tyrannosaurids, like Gorgosaurus, or Daspletosaurus.

== Paleoenvironment ==
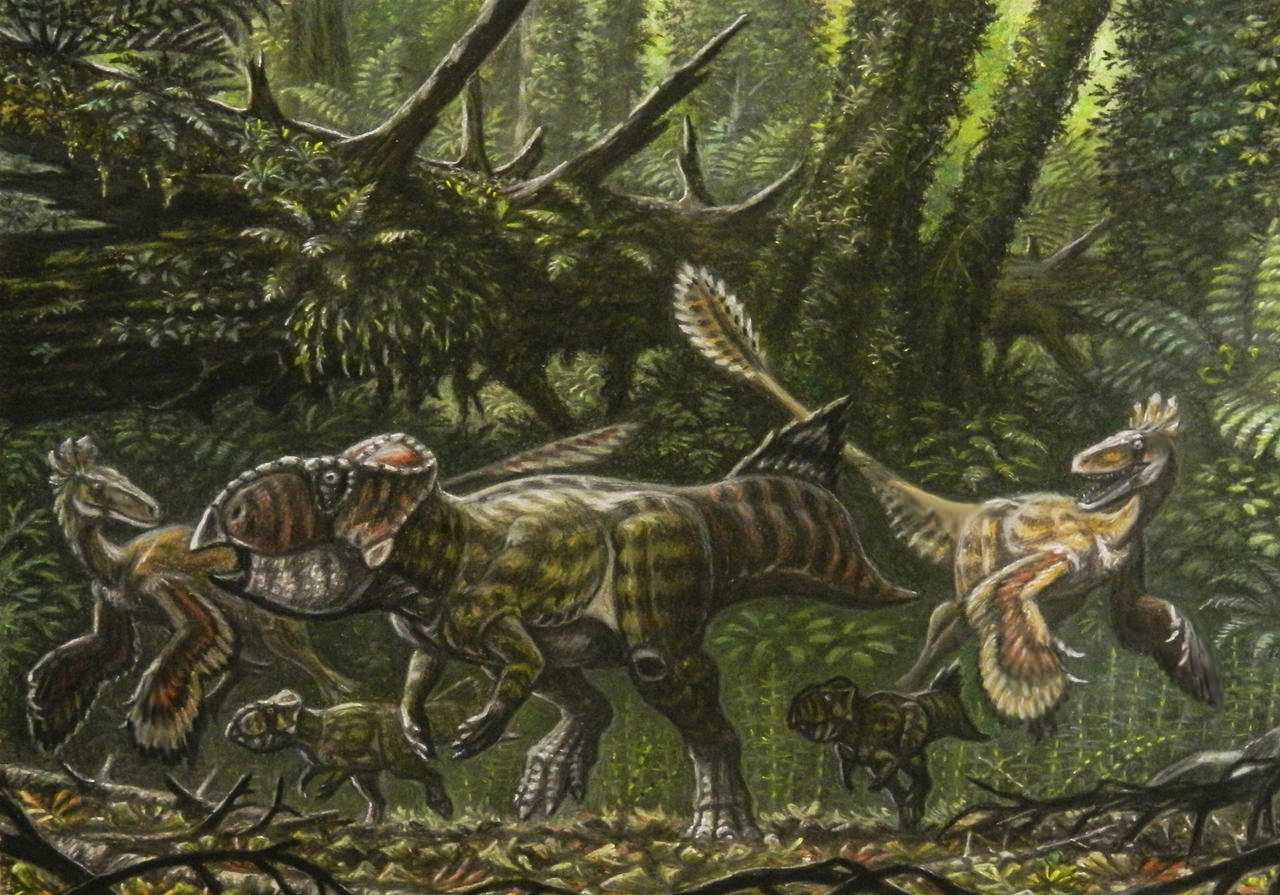
Restoration of a pair of Saurornitholestes hunting Cerasinops

Saurornitholestes was found on both sides of the Western Interior Seaway. Alberta, the location of Saurornitholestes langstoni, had a habitat similar to the United States Middle West being plains and floodplain swamps. In its eastern range, Saurornitholestes lived alongside hadrosaurs like Eotrachodon and Hypsibema, large theropods like Appalachiosaurus and Dryptosaurus, an unidentified ornithomimosaur, and another unidentified small theropod that was likely either a dromaeosaurid or a troodontid. Saurornitholestes appears to have been the most common small theropod in Dinosaur Provincial Park, and teeth and bones are much more common than those of its more robust contemporary, Dromaeosaurus.

== See also ==
- Timeline of dromaeosaurid research
