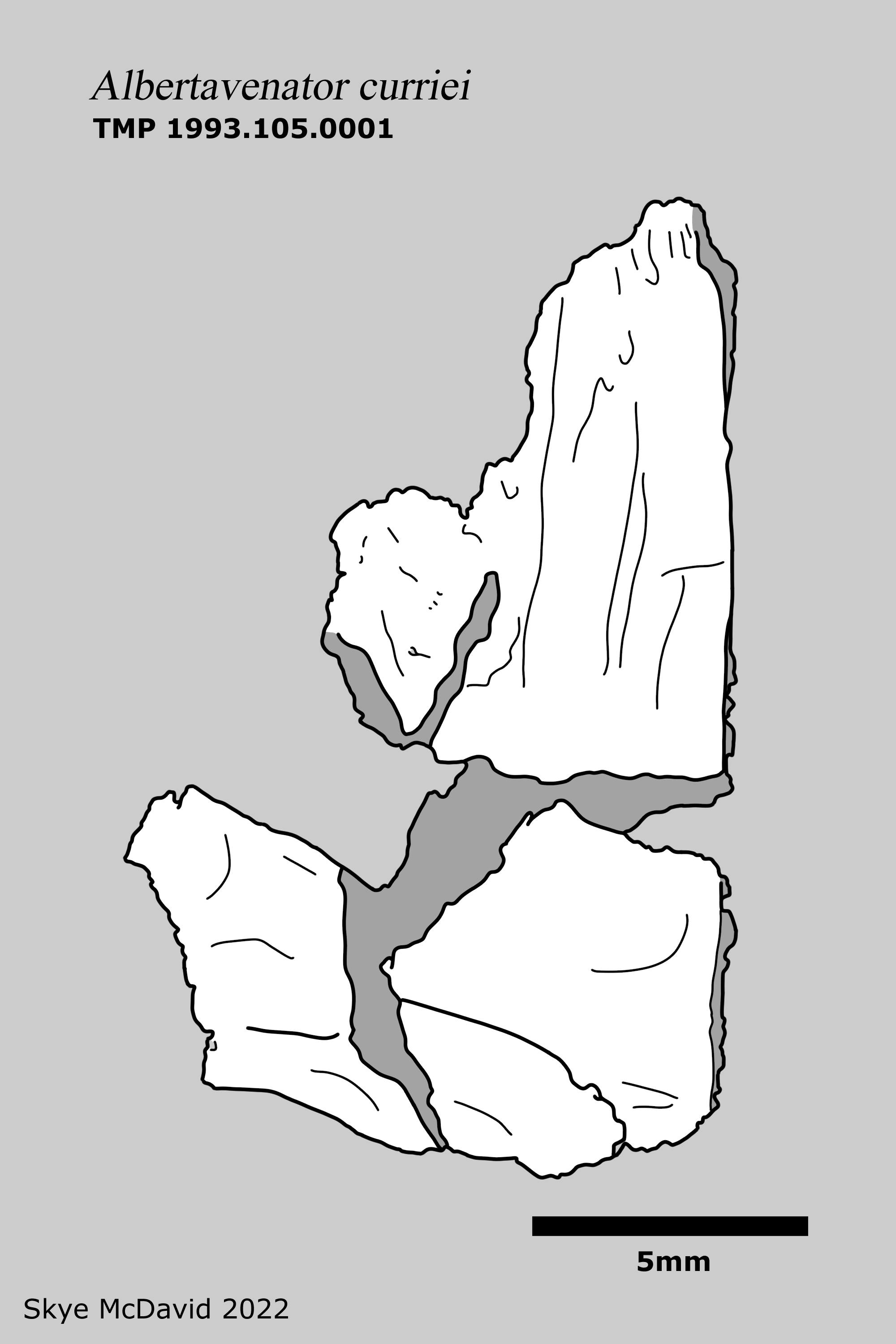
- Illustration of the holotype frontal of Albertavenator

Scientific classification
- Kingdom: Animalia
- Phylum: Chordata
- Class: Reptilia
- Clade: Dinosauria
- Clade: Saurischia
- Clade: Theropoda
- Family: †Troodontidae
- Genus: †Albertavenator; Evans et al., 2017

Type species
- †Albertavenator curriei Evans et al., 2017

= Albertavenator =

Albertavenator Temporal range: Late Cretaceous, 71.5–71 Ma

Extinct genus of dinosaurs

Albertavenator (meaning "Alberta hunter") is a genus of small-bodied troodontid theropod dinosaur that lived during the early Maastrichtian stage of the Late Cretaceous period, approximately 71 million years ago. It is known from the Horseshoe Canyon Formation in Alberta, Canada, and is currently represented by a single species, Albertavenator curriei. The species name honors Canadian paleontologist Philip J. Currie for his extensive contributions to theropod research. The animal is known from parts of the skull.

== History of discovery ==
The holotype specimen of Albertavenator (TMP 1993.105.0001), consisting of a partial left frontal bone, was collected in the early 1990s from the Horsethief Member of the Horseshoe Canyon Formation, near the town of Drumheller, Alberta. A second, smaller frontal (TMP 1996.005.0008) was later referred to the same taxon. Initially, these remains were not recognized as distinct and were considered to belong to Troodon, a genus historically used as a wastebasket taxon for small theropods based on isolated teeth and fragmentary remains.

Detailed study of the frontal bone morphology revealed significant differences from other known troodontids, especially in the proportions and features of the cranial roof. As a result, the material was described as a new genus and species in 2017 by a team led by David C. Evans. The recognition of Albertavenator marked an important step in refining our understanding of Late Cretaceous small theropod diversity in North America, especially within the poorly understood troodontids.

== Description ==
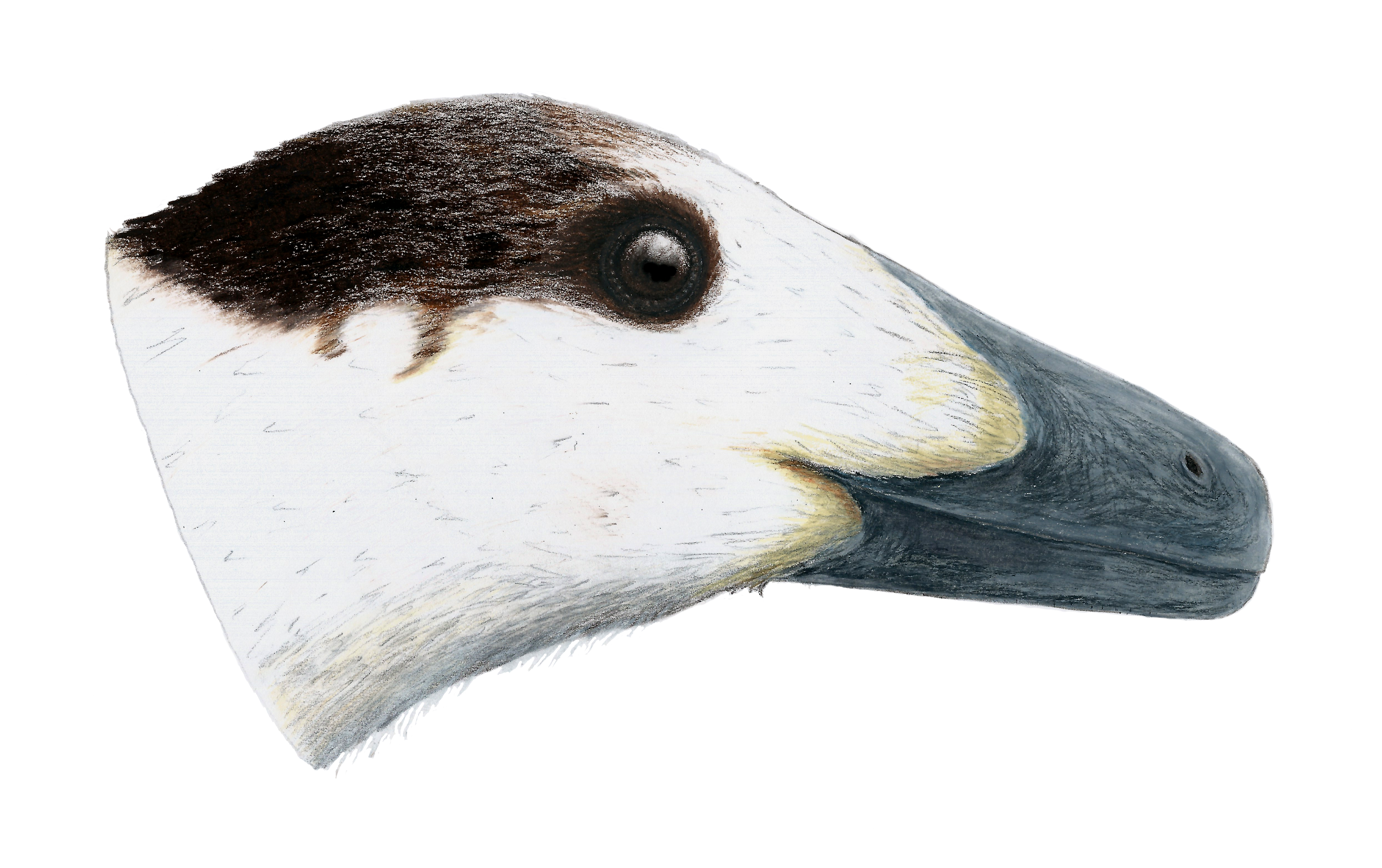
Life restoration of the head

Although only cranial material is known, specifically the frontal bones, Albertavenator exhibits several distinct anatomical features. The frontal bone is notably short and broad, with a length-to-width ratio of less than 1.3, which is shorter than any other known Late Cretaceous troodontid. The bone also displays a unique configuration of the frontoparietal suture, with an enlarged lappet overlapping the anteromedial process of the parietal, and a truncated supraciliary foramen. These autapomorphic features distinguish Albertavenator from other troodontids such as Troodon and Stenonychosaurus.

== Classification ==
Albertavenator is assigned to the family Troodontidae within the clade Paraves. Although a detailed phylogenetic analysis was not conducted in the original description, the authors compared frontal morphology across multiple North American troodontids, concluding that Albertavenator is distinct from both Troodon and Stenonychosaurus. Its recognition underscores the underestimated diversity of small theropods in the Late Cretaceous and the limitations of using isolated teeth for taxonomic identification.

== Paleoecology ==
The Horseshoe Canyon Formation is dated to the early Maastrichtian stage of the Late Cretaceous, and it is composed of floodplain, estuarine, swamp and coastal deposits, dominated by sandstones, mudstones, and coal seams. Many plants such as redwoods, spruces, katsura relatives, plane trees and ferns including the modern cinnamon fern were common in the formation. The fauna includes hadrosaurs, ceratopsians, ankylosaurs, and a diversity of theropods including large tyrannosaurids, such as Albertosaurus. It was much cooler in temperature than other formations nearby.

== See also ==
- Timeline of troodontid research
- 2017 in archosaur paleontology
