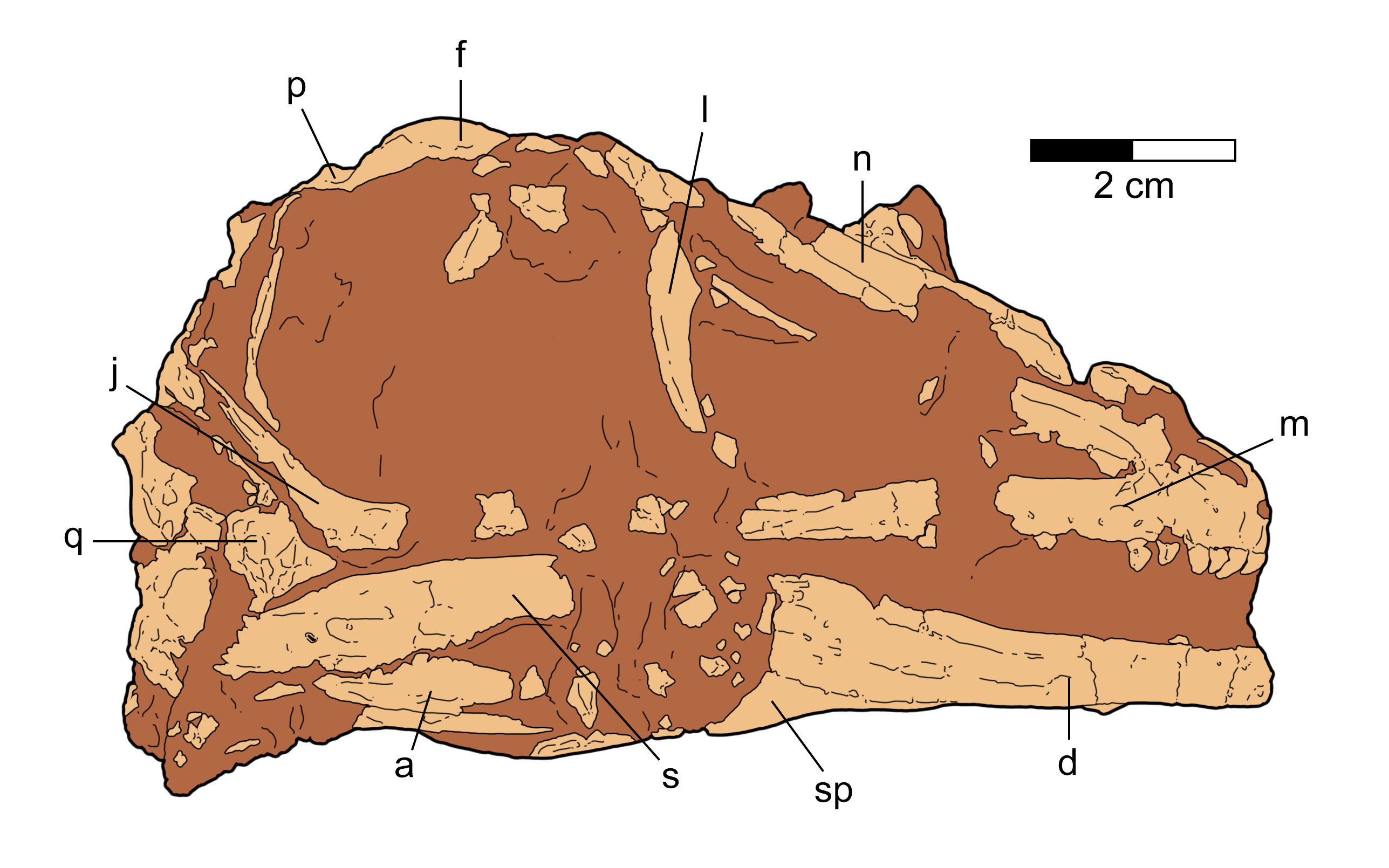
- Holotype skull diagram

Scientific classification
- Domain: Eukaryota
- Kingdom: Animalia
- Phylum: Chordata
- Clade: Dinosauria
- Clade: Saurischia
- Clade: Theropoda
- Family: †Troodontidae
- Genus: †Papiliovenator; Pei et al., 2022
- Species: †P. neimengguensis

Binomial name
- †Papiliovenator neimengguensis Pei et al., 2022

= Papiliovenator =

Papiliovenator Temporal range: 83.6–72.1 Ma Campanian

Genus of troodontid dinosaur from the Late Cretaceous period

Papiliovenator (meaning "butterfly hunter", after a butterfly-shaped feature on its first two dorsal vertebrae) is a genus of troodontid theropod dinosaur from the Bayan Mandahu Formation of Inner Mongolia, China. The type and only species is Papiliovenator neimengguensis.

== Description ==
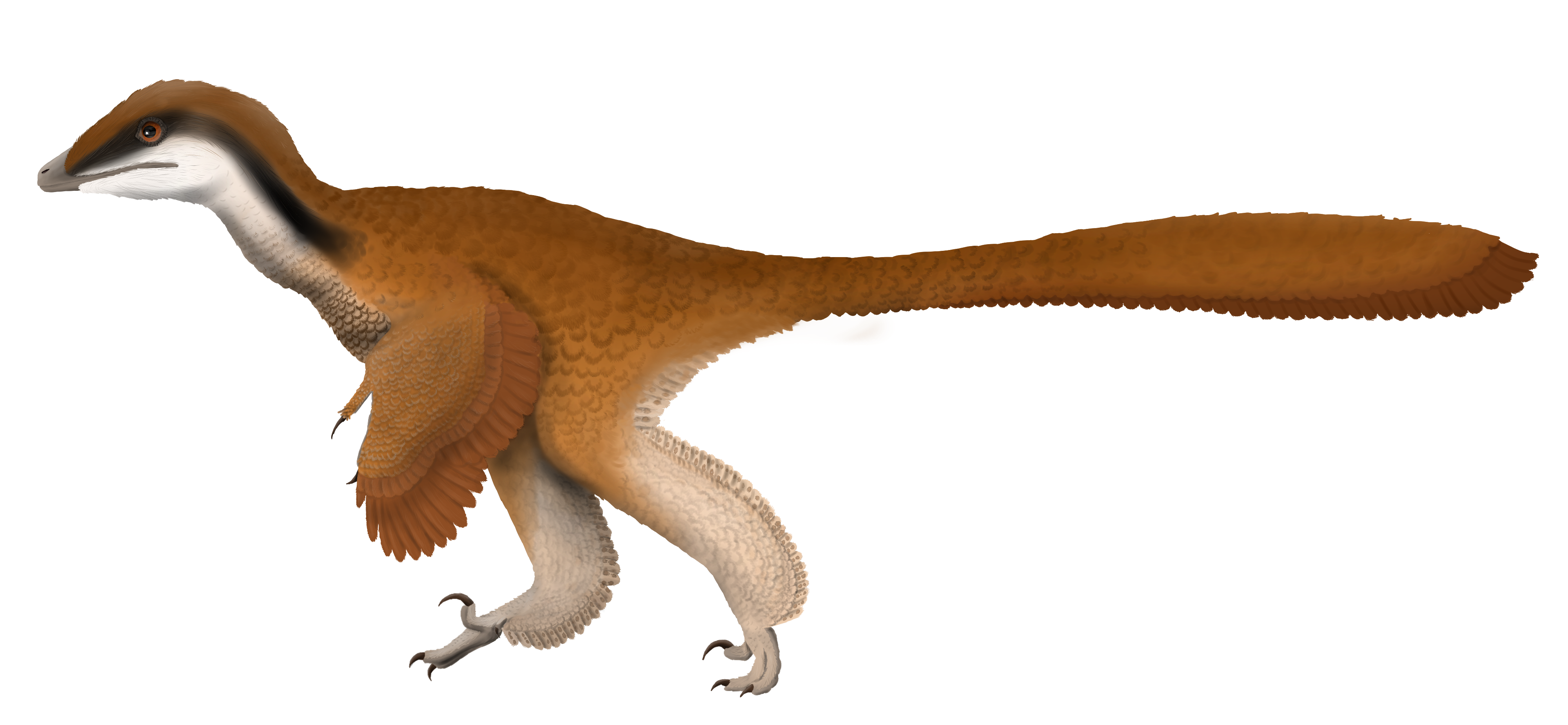
Life restoration

The holotype, BNMNH-PV030, is a partial, semi-articulated subadult skeleton consisting of a nearly complete cranium and other postcranial bones. Uniquely, its snout was short and subtriangular, more similar to that of Early Cretaceous troodontids such as Mei long than the long, low snouts of Late Cretaceous troodontids. This and other unique traits of its skeleton suggest a high diversity of troodontid morphotypes in the Late Cretaceous Gobi Desert.

== Classification ==
Pei et al. recover Papiliovenator as the earliest-diverging member of a clade consisting of all Late Cretaceous troodontids except for Almas ukhaa.

- - Dromaeosauridae
  - Troodontidae
    - - Sinovenator
      - - Mei
        - Jinfengopteryx
    - - Sinusonasus
      - Jianianhualong
      - Sinornithoides
      - EK Troodontid
      - - Almas
        - - Papiliovenator
          - - Xixiasaurus
            - Gobivenator
            - Byronosaurus
            - - Zanabazar
              - - Linhevenator
                - - Saurornithoides
                  - Latenivenatrix
