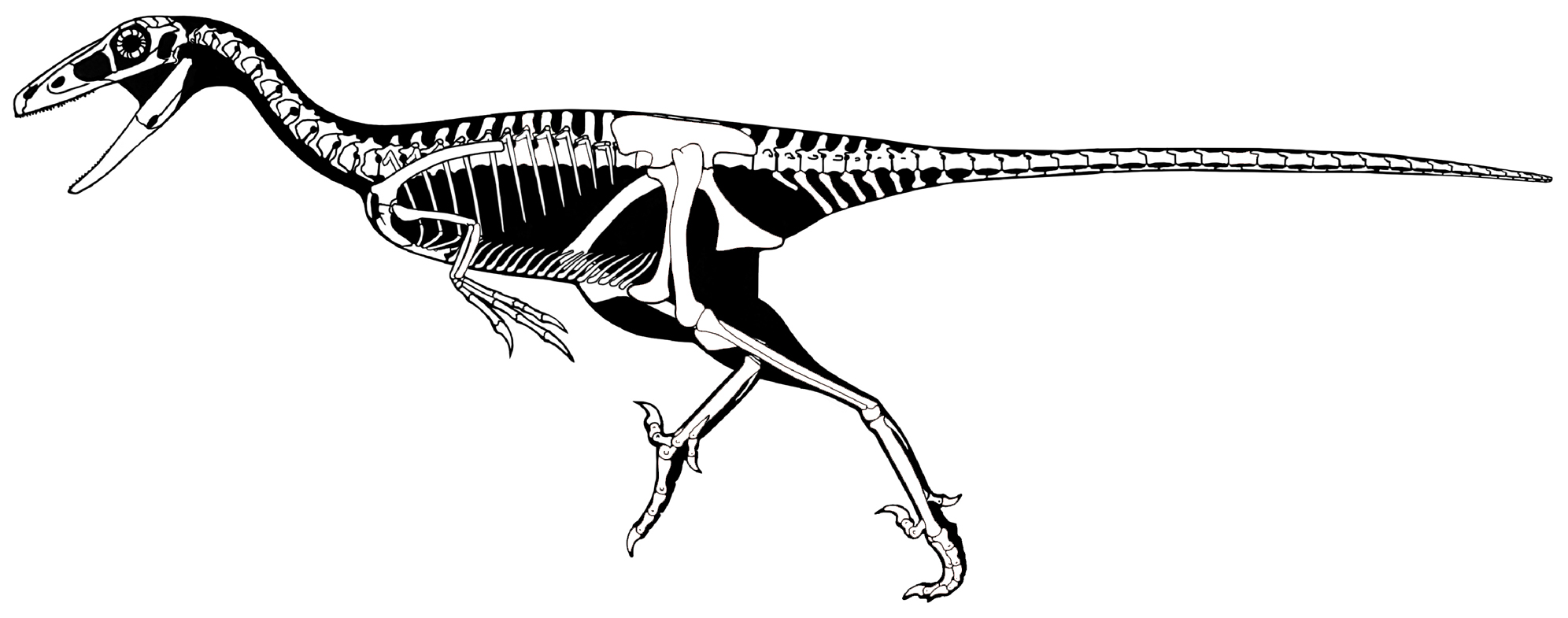
- Skeletal reconstruction, with missing parts based on related genera

Scientific classification
- Kingdom: Animalia
- Phylum: Chordata
- Class: Reptilia
- Clade: Dinosauria
- Clade: Saurischia
- Clade: Theropoda
- Family: †Troodontidae
- Subfamily: †Troodontinae
- Genus: †Stenonychosaurus; Sternberg, 1932

Type species
- †Stenonychosaurus inequalis Sternberg, 1932

Synonyms
- Troodon inequalis (Sternberg, 1932); Latenivenatrix mcmasterae? (van der Reest & Currie, 2017)

= Stenonychosaurus =

Stenonychosaurus Temporal range: Campanian, 76 Ma Possible Late Maastrichtian record

Theropod dinosaur

Stenonychosaurus (meaning "narrow claw lizard") is a disputed genus of troodontid dinosaur from the Late Cretaceous Dinosaur Park Formation of Alberta, Canada, as well as possibly the Two Medicine Formation. The type and only species, S. inequalis, was named by Charles Mortram Sternberg in 1932, based on a foot, fragments of a hand, and some caudal vertebrae from the Late Cretaceous of Alberta. S. inequalis was reassigned in 1987 by Phil Currie to the genus Troodon, which was reverted by the recognition of Stenonychosaurus as a separate genus from the possibly dubious Troodon in 2017 by Evans et al. and also later in the same year by Van der Reest and Currie.

== History of discovery ==
The first specimens currently assigned to Troodon that were not teeth were both found by Sternberg in 1928, in the Dinosaur Park Formation of Alberta. The first was named Stenonychosaurus inequalis by Sternberg in 1932, based on a foot, fragments of a hand, and some tail vertebrae. A remarkable feature of these remains was the enlarged claw on the second toe, which is now recognized as characteristic of early paravians. Sternberg initially classified Stenonychosaurus as a member of the family Coeluridae. The second, a partial lower jawbone, was described by Gilmore (1932) as a new species of lizard which he named Polyodontosaurus grandis. Later, in 1951, Sternberg recognized P. grandis as a possible synonym of Troodon, and speculated that since Stenonychosaurus had a "very peculiar pes" and Troodon "equally unusual teeth", they may be closely related. No comparable specimens were available at that time to test the idea.

The holotype of Stenonychosaurus inequalis, CMN 8539, is a partial skeleton consisting of six caudal vertebrae, hand bones, the distal end of the left tibia and astragalus, and a complete left foot. A couple of cranial specimens were also referred to the genus: UALVP 52611 (a nearly complete skull roof) and TMP 1986.036.0457 (a partial braincase).

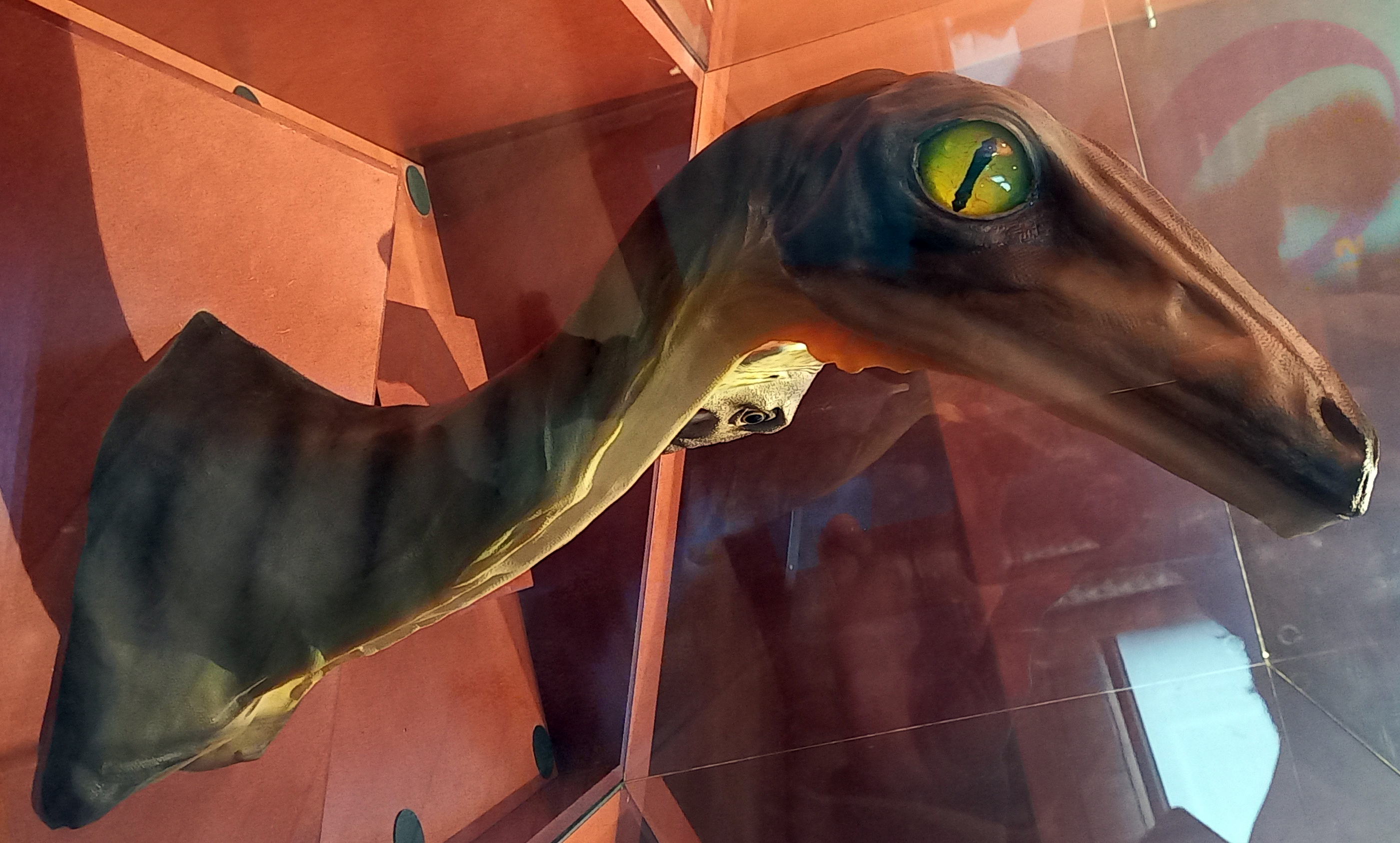
Head and neck of Dale Russell and Ron Seguin's sculpture, Natural History Museum, London

A more complete skeleton of Stenonychosaurus was described by Dale Russell in 1969 from the Dinosaur Park Formation, which eventually formed the scientific foundation for a famous life-sized sculpture of Stenonychosaurus accompanied by its fictional, humanoid descendant, the "dinosauroid".

Stenonychosaurus became a well-known theropod in the 1980s, when the feet and braincase were described in more detail. Along with Saurornithoides, it formed the family Saurornithoididae. Based on differences in tooth structure, and the extremely fragmentary nature of the original Troodon formosus specimens, saurornithoidids were thought to be close relatives while Troodon was considered a dubious possible relative of the family. Phil Currie, reviewing the pertinent specimens in 1987, showed that supposed differences in tooth and jaw structure among troodontids and saurornithoidids were based on age and position of the tooth in the jaw, rather than a difference in species. He reclassified Stenonychosaurus inequalis as well as Polyodontosaurus grandis and Pectinodon bakkeri as junior synonyms of Troodon formosus. Currie also made Saurornithoididae a junior synonym of Troodontidae. In 1988, Gregory S. Paul went farther and included Saurornithoides mongoliensis in the genus Troodon as T. mongoliensis, but this reclassification, along with many other unilateral synonymizations of well known genera, was not adopted by other researchers. Currie's classification of all North American troodontid material in the single species Troodon formosus became widely adopted by other paleontologists, and all of the specimens once called Stenonychosaurus were referred to as Troodon in the scientific literature through the early 21st century.

However, the concept that all Late Cretaceous North American troodontids belong to one species began to be questioned soon after Currie's 1987 paper was published, including by Currie himself. Currie and colleagues (1990) noted that, while they believed the Judith River troodontids were all T. formosus, troodontid fossils from other formations, such as the Hell Creek Formation and Lance Formation, might belong to different species. In 1991, George Olshevsky assigned the Lance formation fossils, which had first been named Pectinodon bakkeri but later synonymized with Troodon formosus to the species Troodon bakkeri, and several other researchers (including Currie) reverted to keeping the Dinosaur Park Formation fossils separate as Troodon inequalis.

In 2011, Zanno and colleagues reviewed the convoluted history of troodontid classification in Late Cretaceous North America. They followed Longrich (2008) in treating Pectinodon bakkeri as a valid genus, and noted that it is likely the numerous Late Cretaceous specimens currently assigned to Troodon formosus almost certainly represent numerous new species, but that a more thorough review of the specimens is required. Because the holotype of T. formosus is a single tooth, this may render Troodon a nomen dubium.

In 2017, Evans and colleagues, building on the work of Zanno and others, confirmed the currently undiagnostic nature of the holotype of Troodon formosus and suggested that Stenonychosaurus be used for troodontid skeletal material from the Dinosaur Park Formation. Later in 2017, Van der Reest and Currie found Stenonychosaurus to be a valid genus, but reassigned much of the known material to the new genus Latenivenatrix.

Many Dinosaur Park troodontid specimens once referred to Troodon have recently been referred to Stenonychosaurus and Latenivenatrix. The specimens now referred to Stenonychosaurus include several frontals (UALVP 5282, TMP 1986.078.0040, TMP 1988.050.0088, TMP 1991.036.0690), a partial dentary (TMP 1982.019.0151), and the distal portion of a left metatarsal III (TMP 1998.068.0090).

In 2021, a more comprehensive re-analysis of the morphology and stratigraphic positions of known skeletal material assigned to Stenonychosaurus and Latenivenatrix determined that several characters described as diagnostic of Latenivenatrix are in fact individually variable, that both taxa overlap stratigraphically, and that Latenivenatrix mcmasterae is a junior synonym of Stenonychosaurus inequalis. This leaves S. inequalis as the only valid troodontid taxon currently identified from the Dinosaur Park Formation.

=== The "Dinosauroid" ===
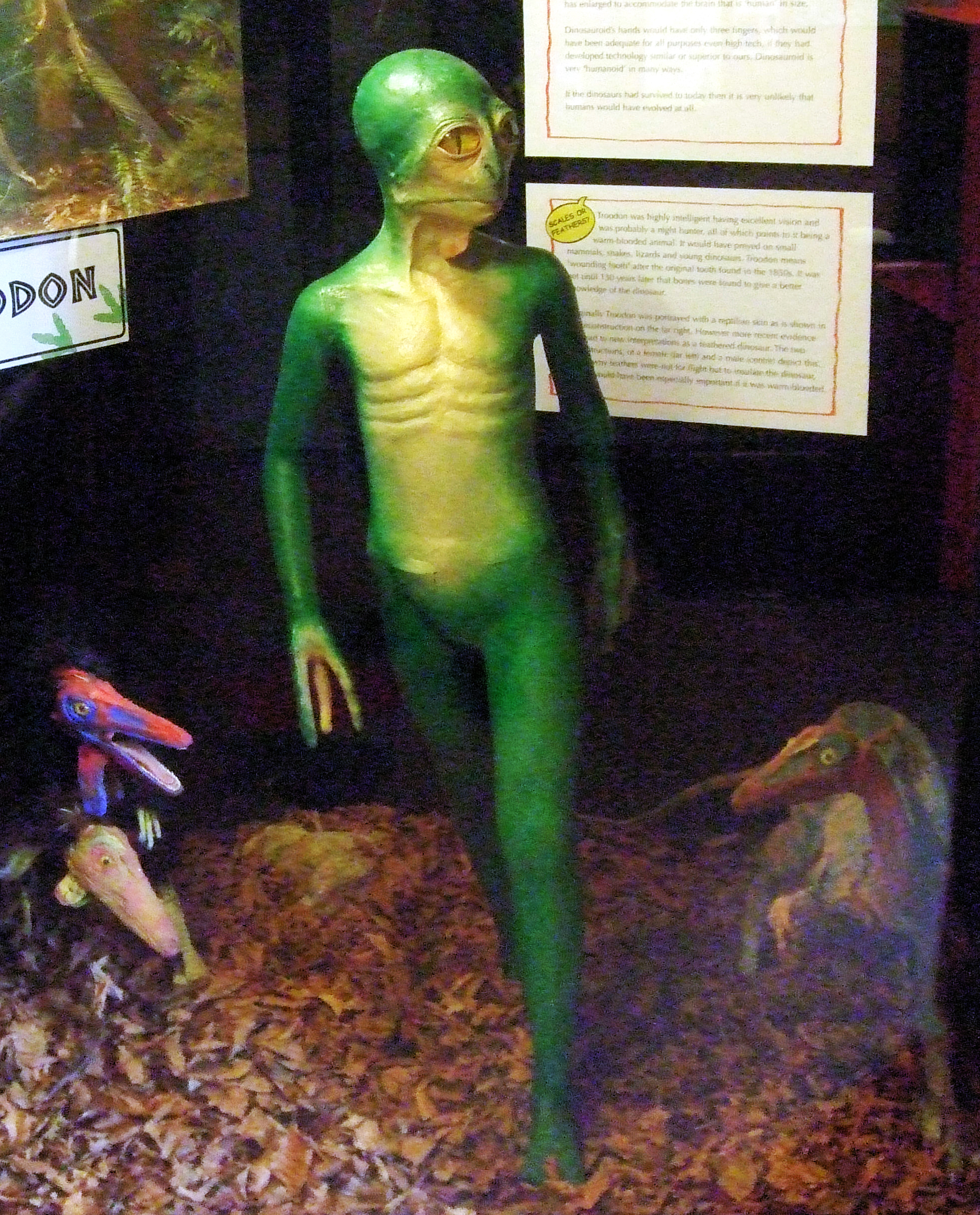
A model of the hypothetical Dinosauroid, Dinosaur Museum, Dorchester

In 1982, Dale A. Russell, then curator of vertebrate fossils at the National Museum of Canada in Ottawa, conjectured a possible evolutionary path for Stenonychosaurus, if it had not perished in the Cretaceous–Paleogene extinction event, suggesting that it could have evolved into intelligent beings similar in body plan to humans. Over geologic time, Russell noted that there had been a steady increase in the encephalization quotient or EQ (the relative brain weight when compared to other species with the same body weight) among the dinosaurs. Russell had discovered the first Troodontid skull, and noted that, while its EQ was low compared to humans, it was six times higher than that of other dinosaurs. Russell suggested that if the trend in Stenonychosaurus evolution had continued to the present, its brain case could by now measure 1,100 cm^{3} (67 cu in), comparable to that of a human (on average, 1,260 cm^{3} (77 cu in) for men and 1,130 cm^{3} (69 cu in) for women).

Troodontids had semi-manipulative fingers, able to grasp and hold objects to a certain degree, and binocular vision. Russell proposed that his "Dinosauroid", like members of the troodontid family, would have had large eyes and three fingers on each hand, one of which would have been partially opposed. Russell also speculated that the "Dinosauroid" would have had a toothless beak. As with most modern reptiles (and birds), he conceived of its genitalia as internal. Russell speculated that it would have required a navel, as a placenta aids the development of a large brain case. However, it would not have possessed mammary glands, and would have fed its young, as some birds do, on regurgitated food. He speculated that its language would have sounded somewhat like bird song.

However, Russell's thought experiment has been met with criticism from other paleontologists since the 1980s, many of whom point out that his Dinosauroid is overly anthropomorphic. Gregory S. Paul (1988) and Thomas R. Holtz Jr. consider it "suspiciously human" and Darren Naish has argued that a large-brained, highly intelligent troodontid would retain a more standard theropod body plan, with a horizontal posture and long tail, and would probably manipulate objects with the snout and feet in the manner of a bird, rather than with human-like "hands".

== Description ==
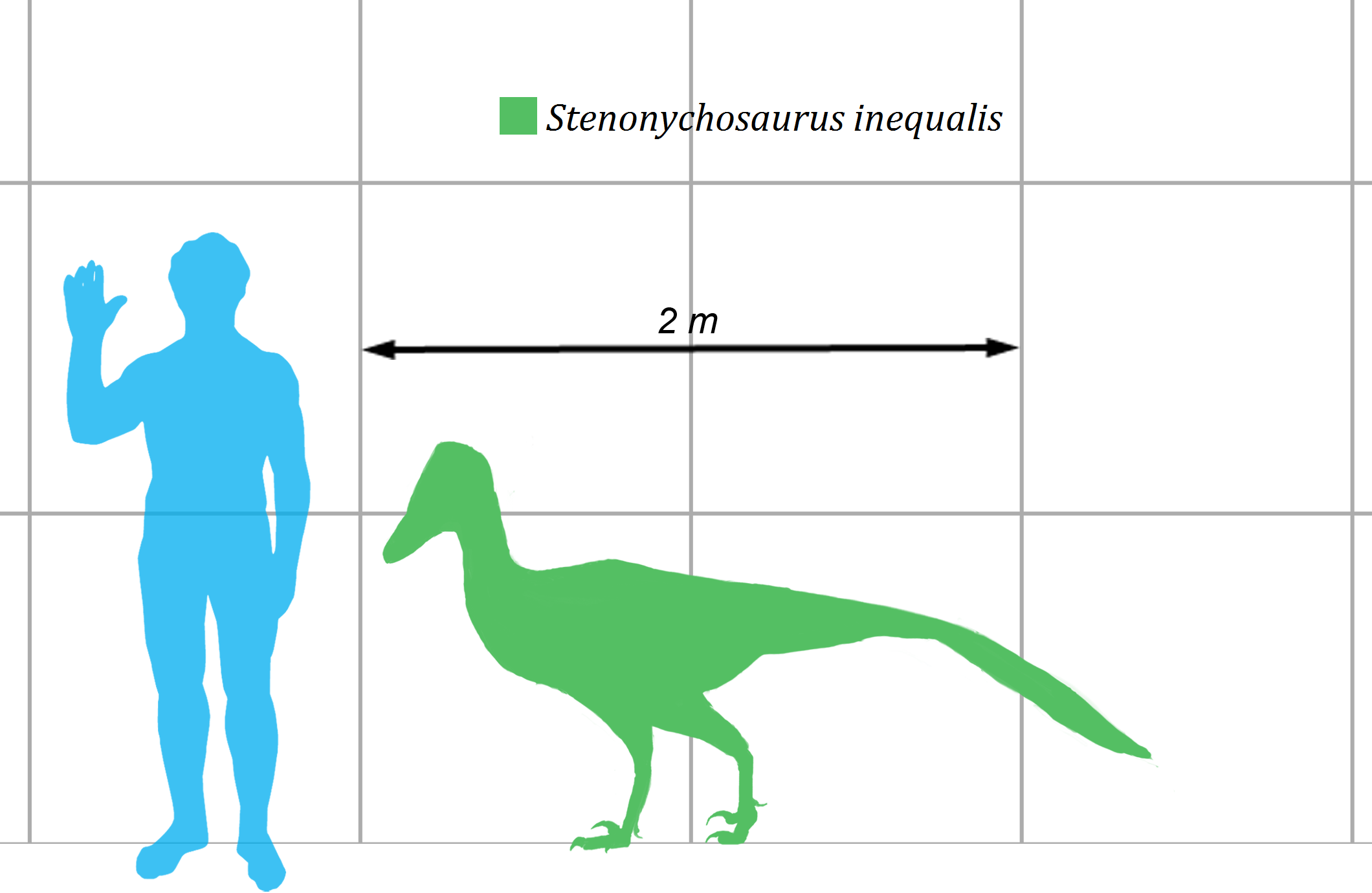
Size compared to a human

Stenonychosaurus was a small dinosaur, up to 2.5 metres (8.2 ft) in length and 35 kilograms (77 lb) in body mass. The largest specimens are comparable in size to Deinonychus and Unenlagia. They had very long, slender hind limbs, suggesting that these animals were able to run quickly. They had large, retractable, sickle-shaped claws on the second toes, which were raised off the ground when running.

Their eyes were very large (perhaps suggesting a partially nocturnal lifestyle), and slightly forward facing, giving Stenonychosaurus some degree of depth perception.

=== Brain and inner ear ===
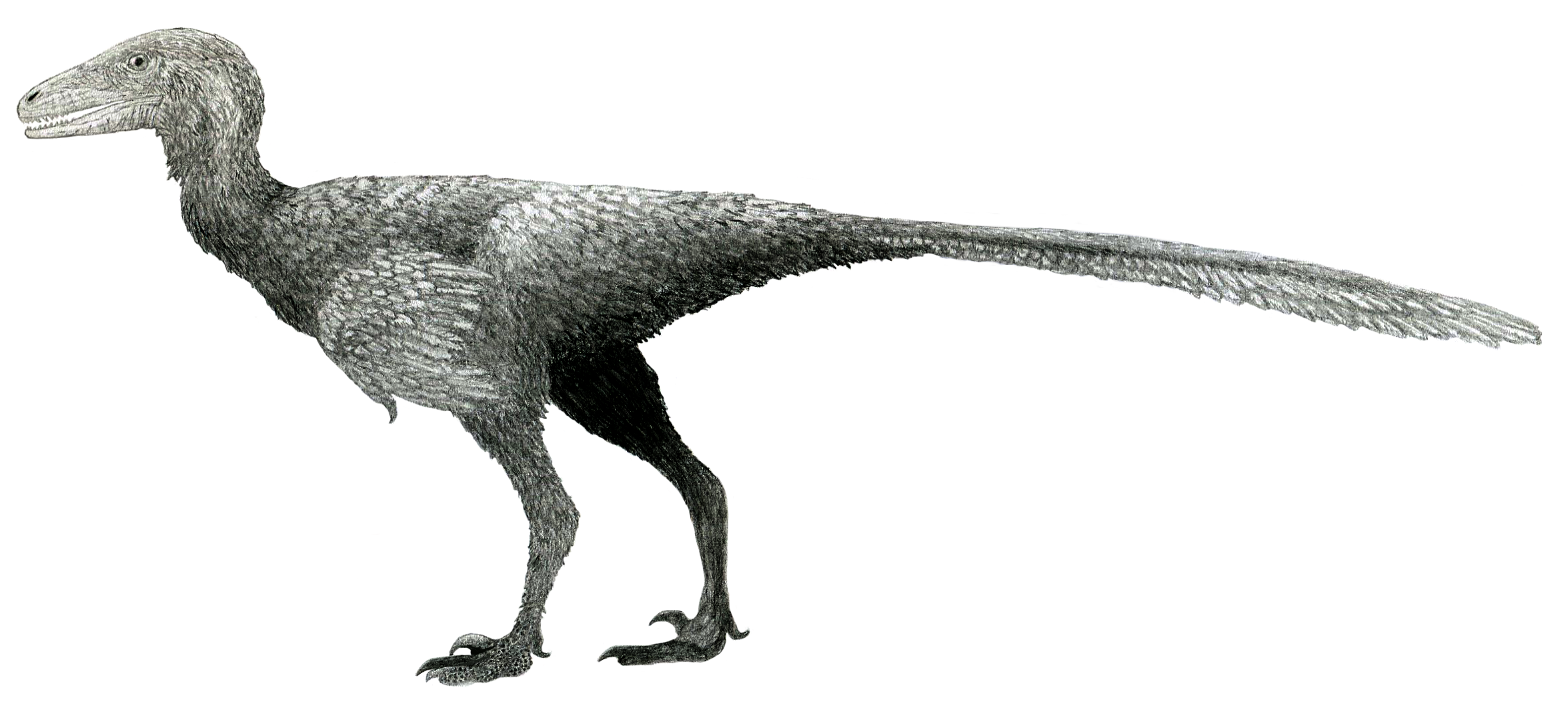
Restoration

Stenonychosaurus had one of the largest known brains of any dinosaur, relative to its body mass (comparable to modern birds). This has been calculated as a cerebrum-to-brain-volume ratio 31.5% to 63% of the way from a non-avian reptile proportion to a truly avian one. Additionally, it had bony cristae supporting their tympanic membranes, that were ossified at least in their top and bottom regions. The rest of the cristae were either cartilaginous or too delicate to be preserved. The metotic strut of Stenonychosaurus was enlarged from side-to-side, similar to Dromaeosaurus and primitive birds like Archaeopteryx and Hesperornis.

== Paleobiology ==
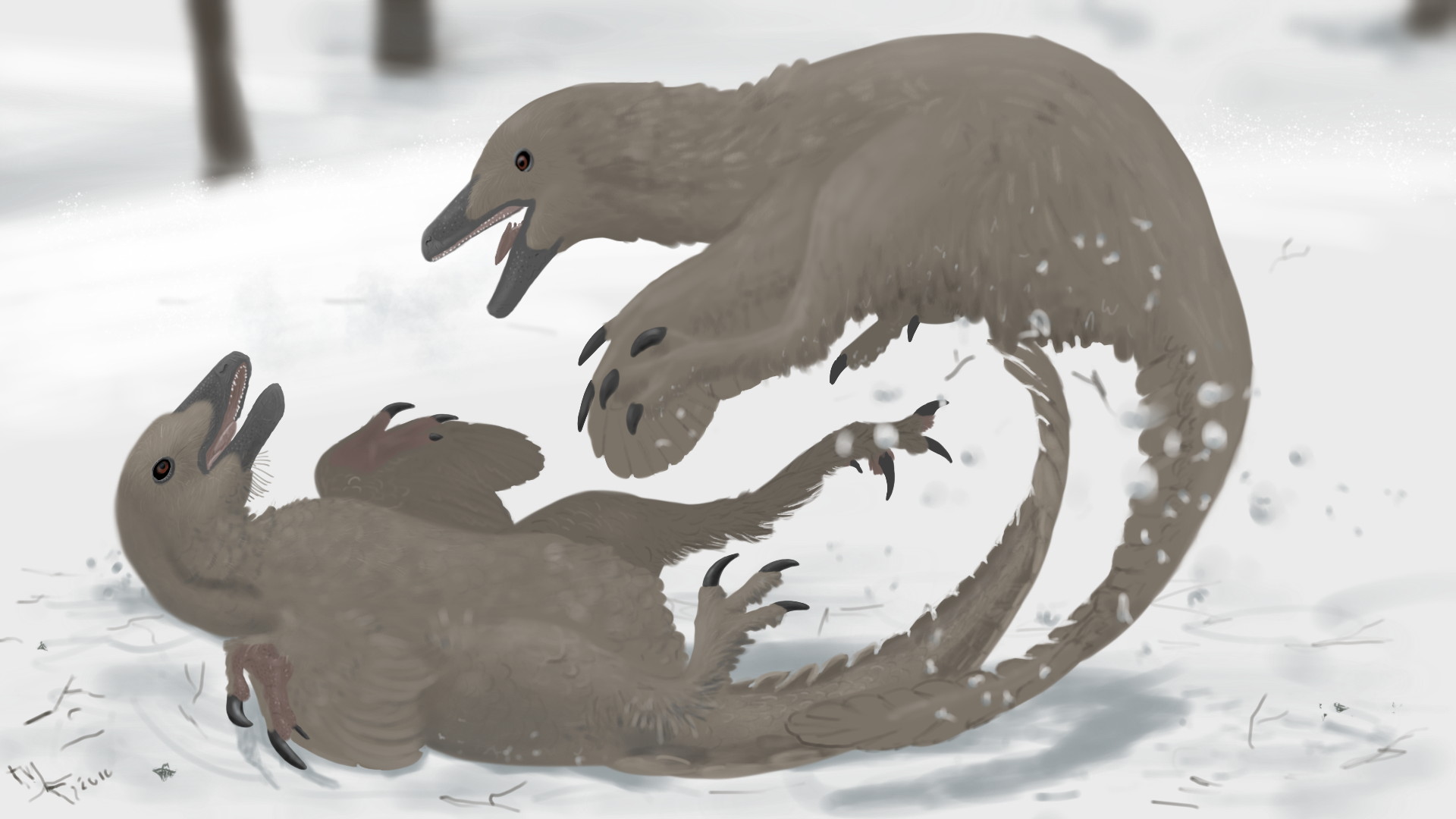
Restoration of two individuals playing in snow

Stenonychosaurus are thought to have been predators, a view supported by its sickle claw on the foot and apparently good binocular vision.

Stenonychosaurus teeth, however, are different from most other theropods. One comparative study of the feeding apparatus suggests that Stenonychosaurus could have been an omnivore. The jaws met in a broad, U-shaped symphysis similar to that of an iguana, a lizard species adapted to a plant-eating lifestyle. Additionally, the teeth of Stenonychosaurus bore large serrations, each of which is called a denticle. There are pits at the intersections of the denticles, and the points of the denticles point towards the tip, or apex, of each tooth. The teeth show wear facets on their sides. Holtz (1998) also noted that characteristics used to support a predatory habit for Stenonychosaurus – the grasping hands, large brain, and stereoscopic vision – are all characteristics shared with herbivorous or omnivorous primates and omnivorous Procyon (raccoon).

Age determination studies performed on the Two Medicine troodont using growth ring counts suggest that this dinosaur reached its adult size probably in 3–5 years.

A partial skeleton has been discovered with preserved puncture marks, possibly inflicted by a predator.

=== Reproduction ===
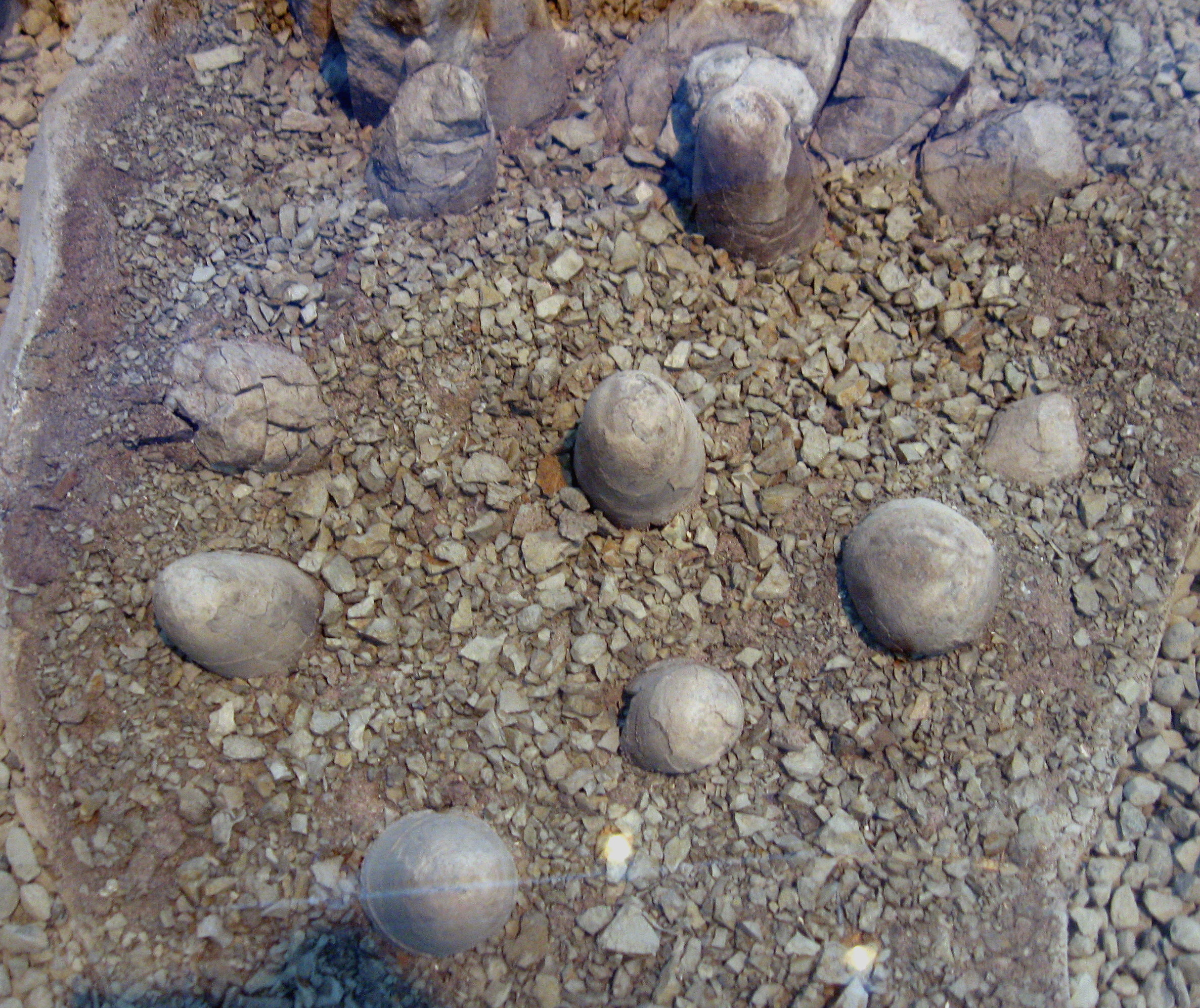
Eggs partly encased in rock, Burke Museum

Dinosaur eggs and nests were discovered by John R. Horner in 1983 in the Two Medicine Formation of Montana. Varriccho et al. (2002) have described eight of these nests found to date. These are all in the collection of the Museum of the Rockies and their accession numbers are MOR 246, 299, 393, 675, 676, 750, 963, 1139. Horner (1984) found isolated bones and partial skeletons of the hypsilophodont Orodromeus very near the nests in the same horizon and described the eggs as those of Orodromeus. Horner and Weishampel (1996) reexamined the embryos preserved in the eggs and determined that they were those of Troodon, not Orodromeus. Varricchio et al. (1997) made this determination with even more certainty when they described a partial skeleton of an adult Troodon (MOR 748) in contact with a clutch of at least five eggs (MOR 750), probably in a brooding position. Van der Reest and Currie considered it possible that the Two Medicine troodont was the same species as Stenonychosaurus.

Varricchio et al. (1997) described the exact structure of the nests. They were built from sediments, they were dish shaped, about 100 cm (39 in) in internal diameter, and with a pronounced raised rim encircling the eggs. The more complete nests had between 16 (minimum number in MOR 246) and 24 (MOR 963) eggs. The eggs are shaped like elongated teardrops, with the more tapered ends pointed downwards and embedded about halfway in the sediment. The eggs are pitched at an angle so that, on average, the upper half is closer to the center of the nest. There is no evidence that plant matter was present in the nest.

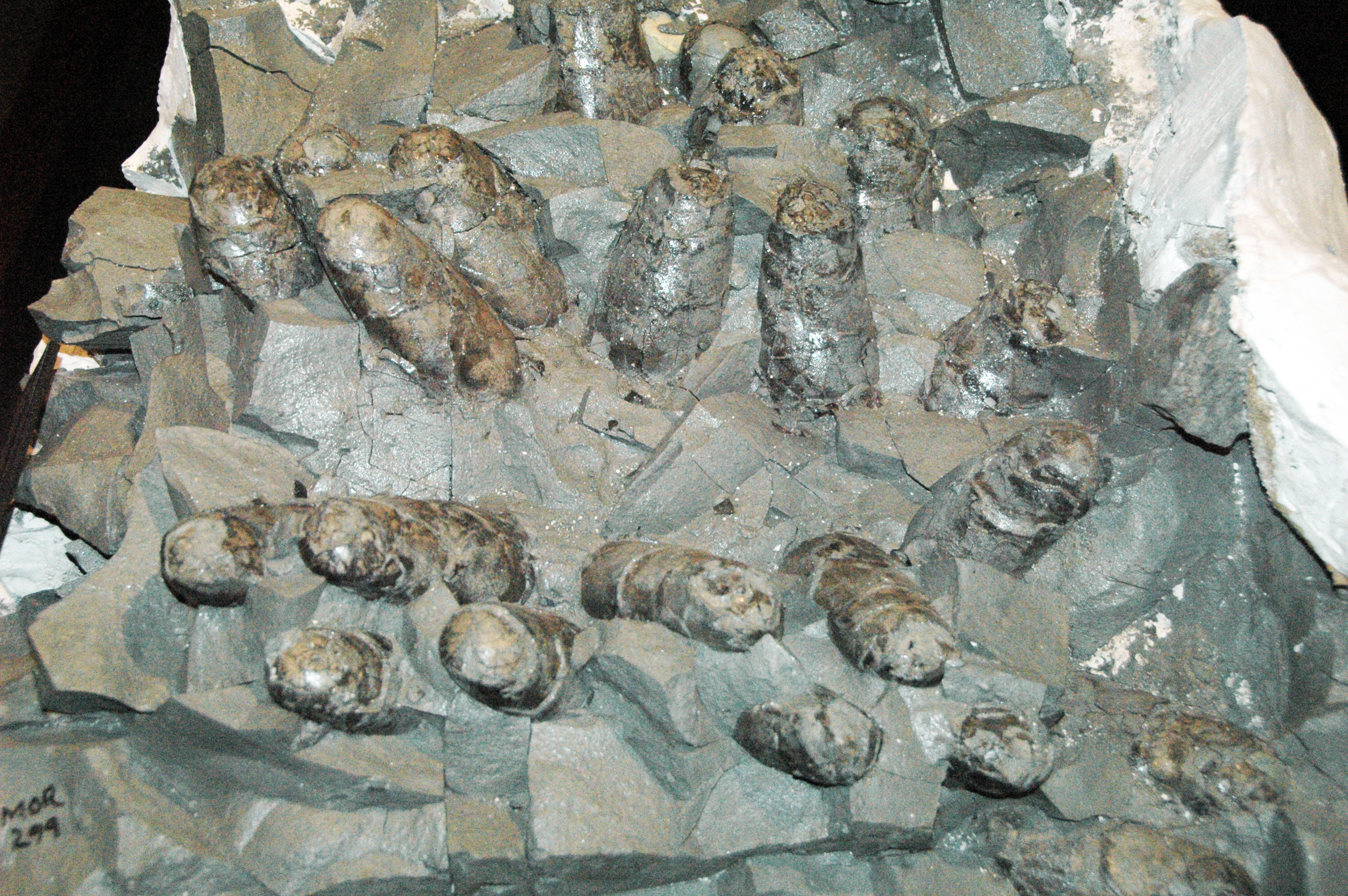
Clutch of eggs, Museum of the Rockies

Varricchio et al.(1997) were able to extract enough evidence from the nests to infer several characteristics of troodont reproductive biology. The results are that they appear to have had a type of reproduction that is intermediate between crocodiles and birds, as phylogeny would predict. The eggs are statistically grouped in pairs, which suggests that the animal had two functional oviducts, like crocodiles, rather than one, as in birds. Crocodiles lay many eggs that are small proportional to adult body size. Birds lay fewer, larger, eggs. The Two Medicine troodont was intermediate, laying an egg of about 0.5 kg (1.1 lb) for a 50 kg (110 lb) adult. This is 10 times larger than reptiles of the same mass, but two troodont eggs are roughly equivalent to the 1.1 kg (2.4 lb) egg predicted for a 50 kg (110 lb) bird.

Varricchio et al. also found evidence for iterative laying, where the adult might lay a pair of eggs every one or two days, and then ensured simultaneous hatching by delaying brooding until all eggs were laid. MOR 363 was found with 22 empty (hatched) eggs, and the embryos found in the eggs of MOR 246 were in very similar states of development, implying that all of the young hatched approximately simultaneously. The embryos had an advanced degree of skeletal development and empty eggs were relatively uncrushed, implying that hatchlings were precocial. The authors estimated 45 to 65 total days of adult nest attendance for laying, brooding, and hatching.

Varricchio et al. (2008) examined the bone histology of Two Medicine troodont specimen MOR 748 and found that it lacked the bone resorption patterns that would indicate it was an egg-laying female. They also measured the ratio of the total volume of eggs in clutches to the body mass of the adult. They graphed correlations between this ratio and the type of parenting strategies used by extant birds and crocodiles and found that the ratio in the troodont was consistent with that in birds where only the adult male broods the eggs. From this they concluded that troodont females likely did not brood eggs, that the males did, and this may be a character shared between maniraptoran dinosaurs and basal birds. However, a later analysis of avian clutch mass found that the type of parental care cannot be determined using conventional allometric methods such as the one used by Varricchio et al.

== Paleoecology ==
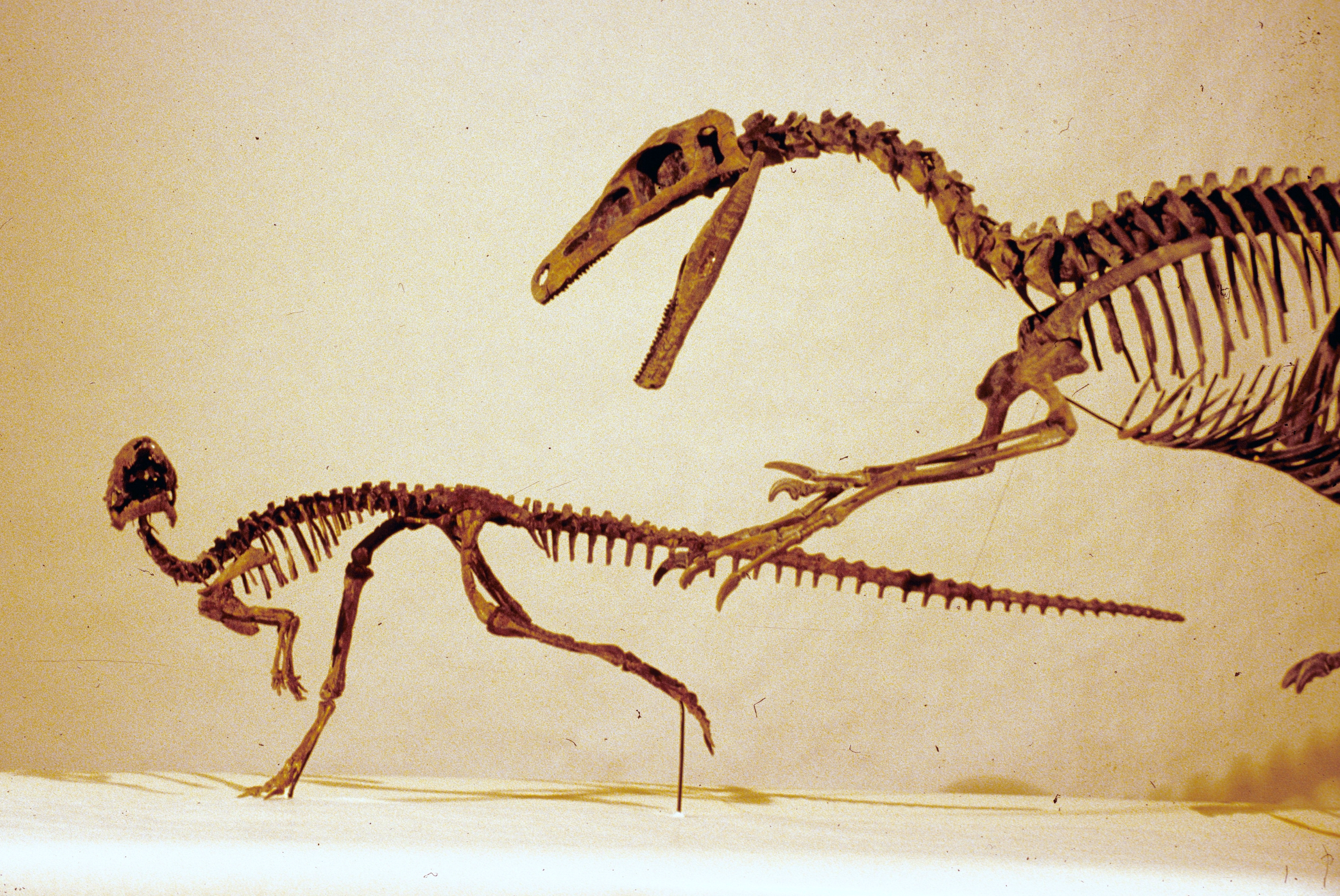
Reconstructed skeleton (right)

Stenonychosaurus inequalis is known from the Dinosaur Park Formation of southern Alberta, Canada, which at the time was a warm coastal floodplain covered by temperate forests. Apex predators included tyrannosaurids such as Daspletosaurus and Gorgosaurus. Herbivores included hadrosaurids such as Lambeosaurus, Corythosaurus, and Prosaurolophus; ceratopsids such as Styracosaurus, Centrosaurus, and Chasmosaurus; ankylosaurs such as Scolosaurus, Euoplocephalus, and Edmontonia; and pachycephalosaurs such as Stegoceras and Foraminacephale.
