= Anyphops sexspinatus =

Concordia Anyphops Flat Spider

Conservation status
- Least Concern (SANBI Red List)

Scientific classification
- Kingdom: Animalia
- Phylum: Arthropoda
- Subphylum: Chelicerata
- Class: Arachnida
- Order: Araneae
- Infraorder: Araneomorphae
- Family: Selenopidae
- Genus: Anyphops
- Species: A. sexspinatus

Binomial name
- Anyphops sexspinatus (Lawrence, 1940)

Synonyms
- Selenops sexspinatus Lawrence, 1940

Species of spider

Anyphops sexspinatus is a species of spider in the family Selenopidae. It is endemic to the Northern Cape, South Africa and is commonly known as the Concordia Anyphops flat spider.

== Distribution ==
Anyphops sexspinatus is found in the Northern Cape, South Africa. The species occurs at altitudes ranging from 182 to 1342 m above sea level. Known locations include Concordia, Kamieskroon, Leliefontein, Richtersveld Transfrontier National Park, and Namaqua National Park.

== Habitat and ecology ==
The species inhabits Desert and Succulent Karoo biomes. Anyphops sexspinatus are free-living cryptozoic nocturnal ground-dwelling spiders.

== Description ==
Anyphops sexspinatus is known only from the female. The specimen is bleached. The carapace is light yellow-brown, darker anteriorly than posteriorly. The thoracic stria, the boundaries of the cephalic area, and the areas surrounding the eyes are brown, darker than the remainder. Radiations from the stria are faint.

The abdomen above is bleached or rubbed. All legs have distinct bands, especially on the tibiae. Tibia I and II have 6, metatarsus I and II have 3 pairs of inferior spines. The total length is 14.5 mm.

== Conservation ==
Anyphops sexspinatus is listed as Least Concern. Much natural habitat remains within its range and it is likely to be undersampled. The species is protected in Richtersveld National Park and Namaqua National Park. Additional sampling is needed to collect males and determine the species' range. There are no known threats to the species.

== Taxonomy ==
The species was originally described by Reginald Frederick Lawrence in 1940 as Selenops sexspinatus from Concordia in the Northern Cape. It was transferred to the genus Anyphops by Benoit in 1968. The species was wrongly listed in the World Spider Catalog as occurring in Namibia.
