= Anyphops stridulans =

Scientific classification
- Kingdom: Animalia
- Phylum: Arthropoda
- Subphylum: Chelicerata
- Class: Arachnida
- Order: Araneae
- Infraorder: Araneomorphae
- Family: Selenopidae
- Genus: Anyphops
- Species: A. stridulans

Binomial name
- Anyphops stridulans (Lawrence, 1940)

Species of spider

Anyphops stridulans is a species of spider in the family Selenopidae. It is endemic to the Northern Cape of South Africa.

== Distribution ==
Anyphops stridulans is known only from the type locality of Steinkopf in the Northern Cape province of South Africa.

== Habitat and ecology ==
The species inhabits the Succulent Karoo biome at an altitude of 870 m above sea level. These are free-living cryptozoic nocturnal ground living spiders that have been sampled from under stones.

== Description ==
Anyphops stridulans is known from only the male. The carapace is pale yellow, almost without markings, with a few indistinct darker spots near the lateral margin and a dark bar behind each eye surrounded by large black areas.

The abdomen is yellow with a few minute spots at the sides of the posterior extremity. Legs are yellow with a few indistinct blackish spots and stripes. The tibiae I and II have 6 pairs of inferior spines, some of them extremely long, plus 2 lateral spines on each side and 4-5 superior spines. The metatarsi I and II have 3 pairs of inferior spines and 2 lateral spines on each side in the basal half.

Total length is 7-8 mm.

== Conservation ==
Anyphops stridulans is listed as Data Deficient for taxonomic reasons, as the species is known only from the type locality and only from the male. More sampling is needed to collect the female and determine the species' range.

== Taxonomy ==
The species was originally described by Reginald Frederick Lawrence in 1940 as Selenops stridulans from Steinkopf. It was later transferred to the genus Anyphops by Corronca in 1996.
