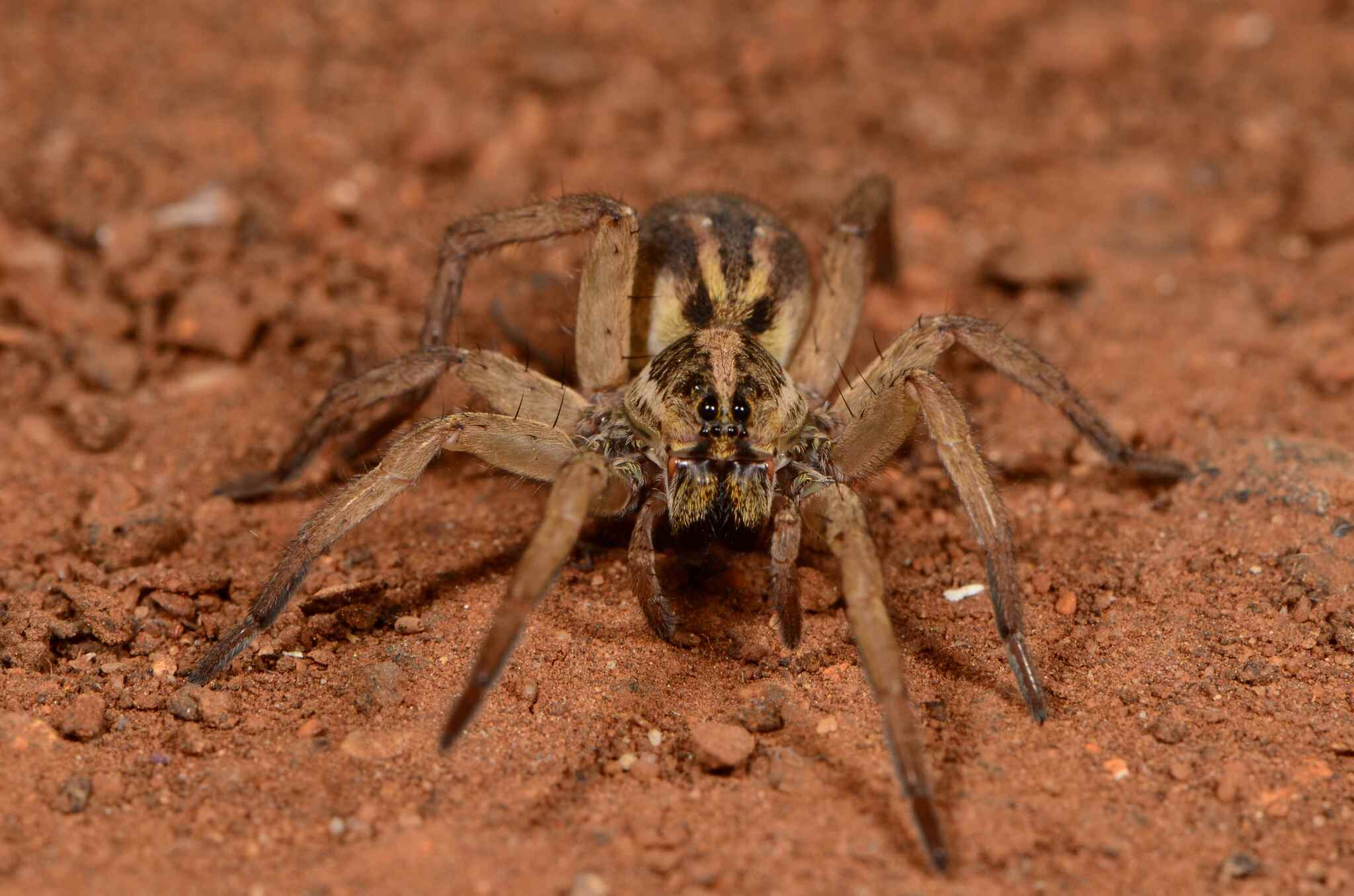
- female
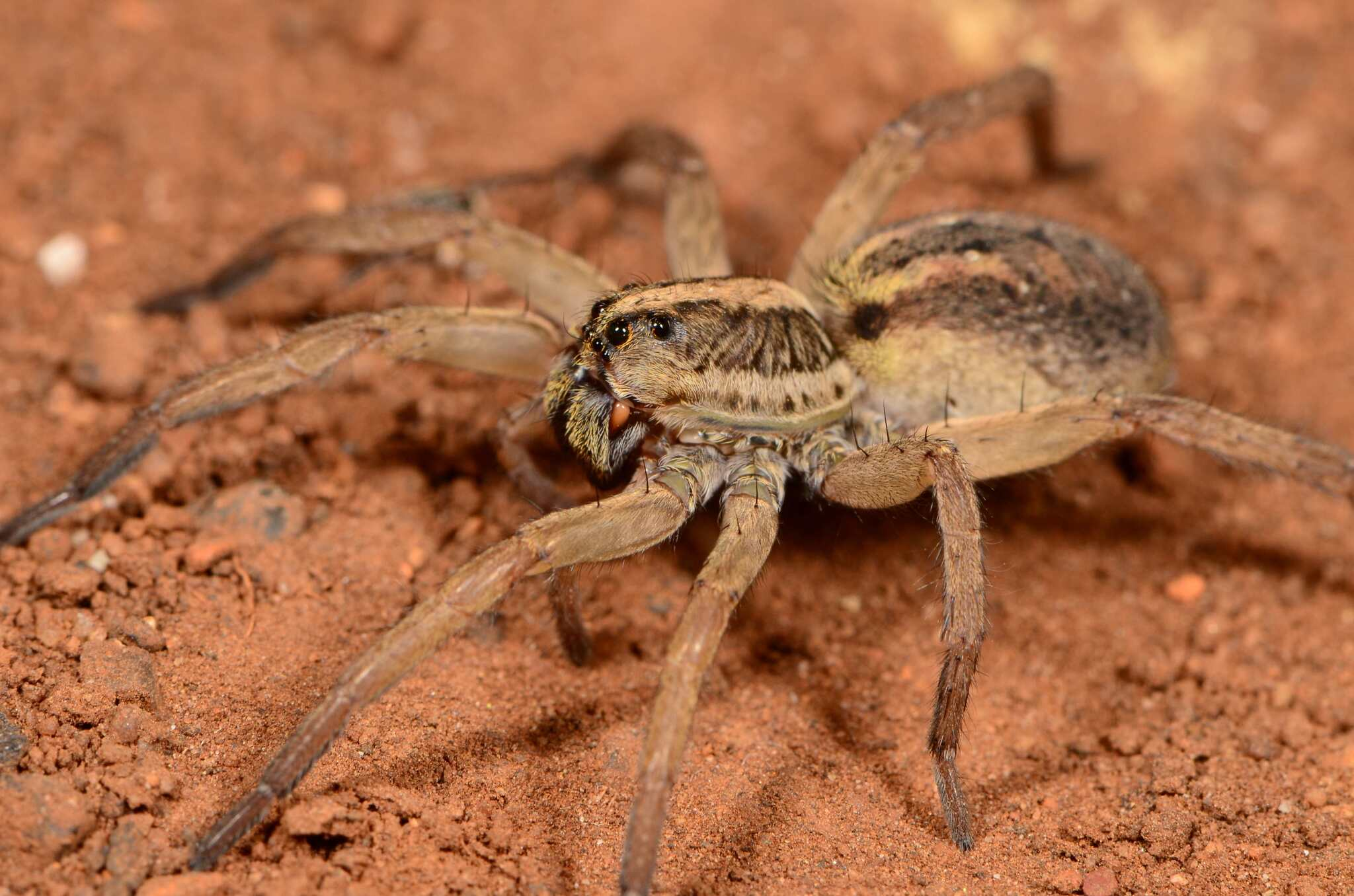
- female

Scientific classification
- Kingdom: Animalia
- Phylum: Arthropoda
- Subphylum: Chelicerata
- Class: Arachnida
- Order: Araneae
- Infraorder: Araneomorphae
- Family: Lycosidae
- Genus: Hogna
- Species: H. lawrencei

Binomial name
- Hogna lawrencei (Roewer, 1960)

Synonyms
- Lycorma lawrencei Roewer, 1960

= Hogna lawrencei =

Lawrence's burrow-living wolf spider

Species of spider

Hogna lawrencei is a species of spider in the family Lycosidae. It is found in southern Africa and is commonly known as Lawrence's burrow-living wolf spider.

== Distribution ==
Hogna lawrencei is found in Botswana and South Africa.

In South Africa, it is known from Gauteng, KwaZulu-Natal, and the Northern Cape.

== Habitat and ecology ==
This species is a ground dweller that lives in open burrows. It has been sampled from the Grassland and Savanna biomes at altitudes ranging from 91 to 1647 m.

== Description ==
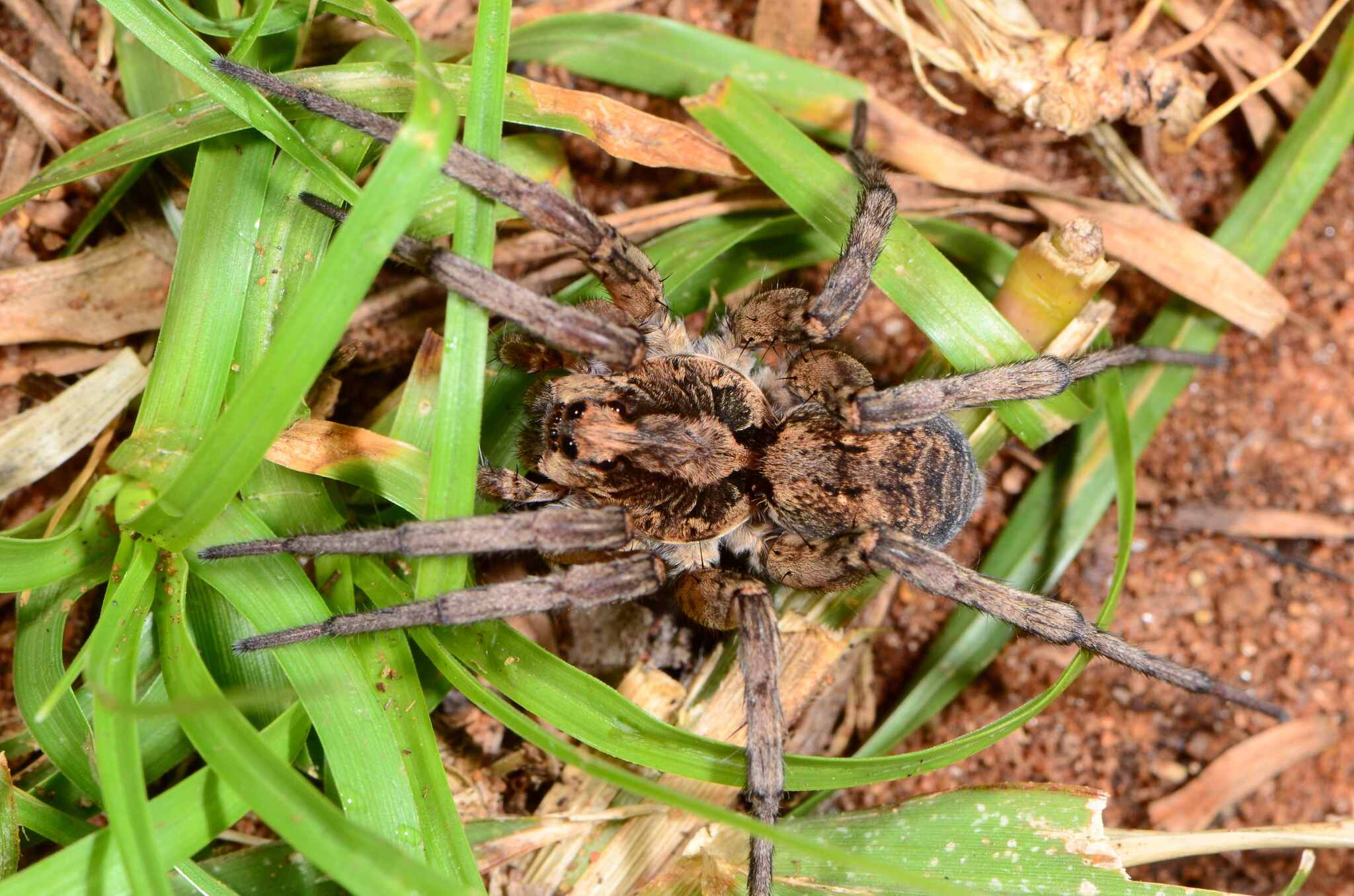
female

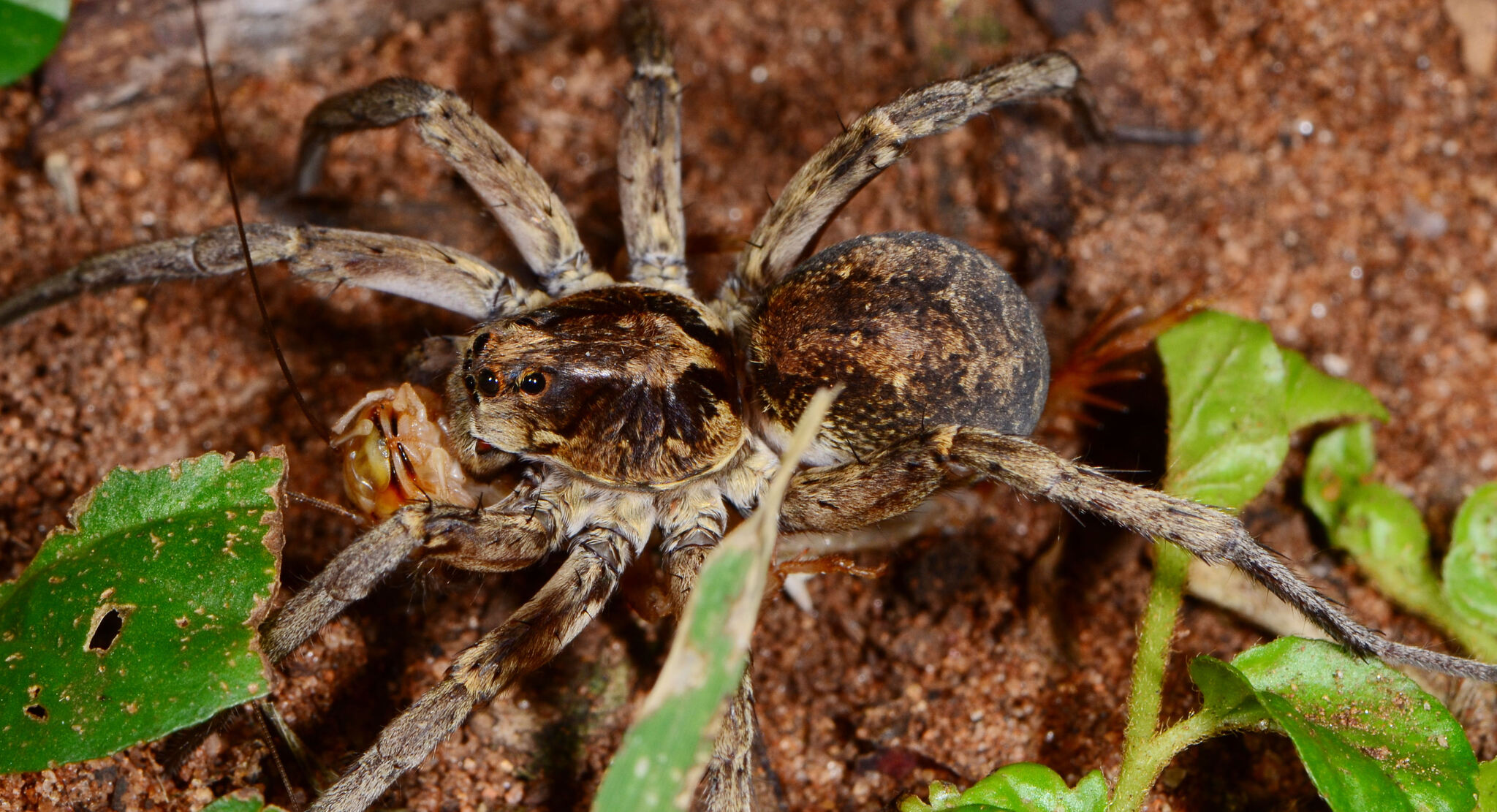
female

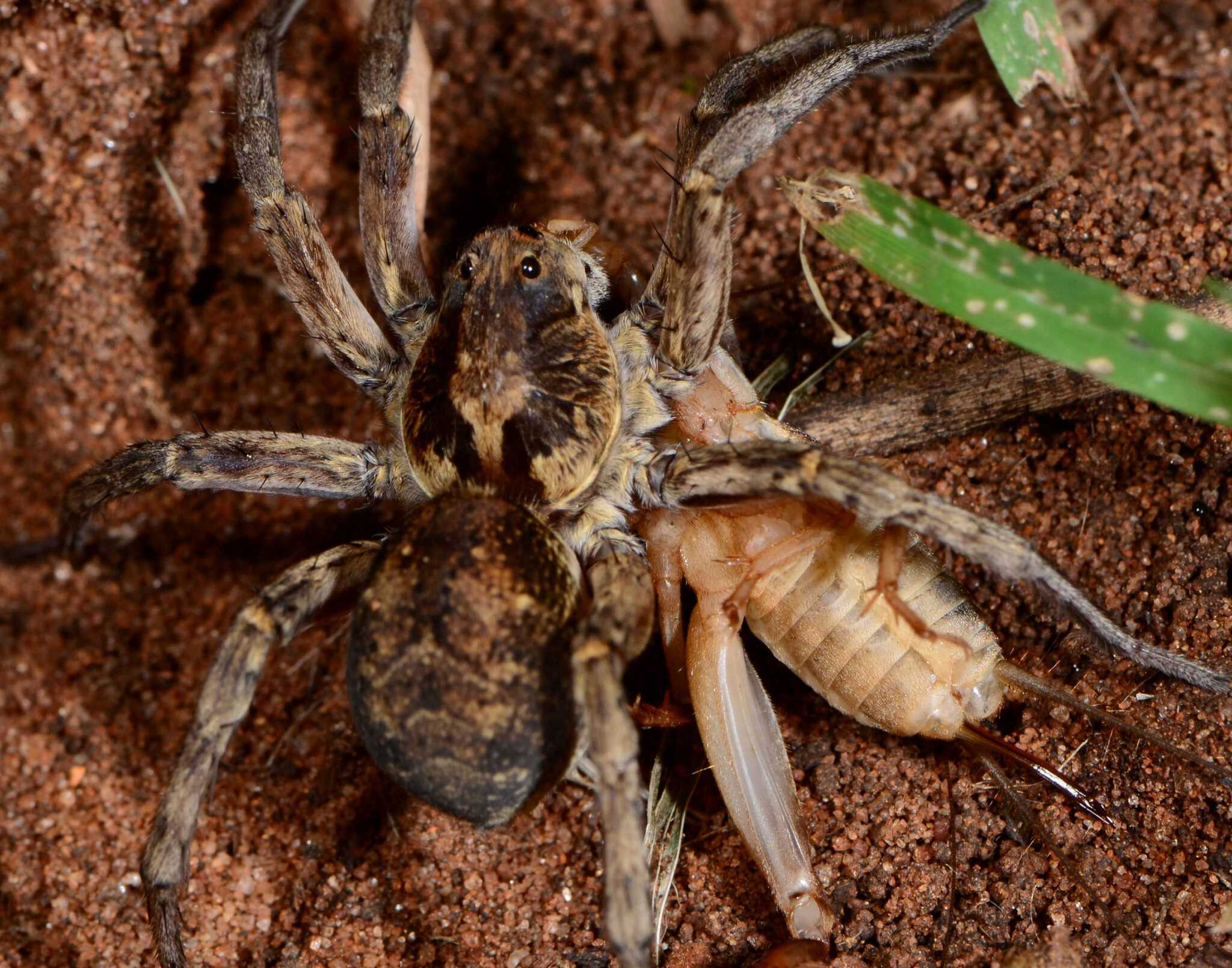
female

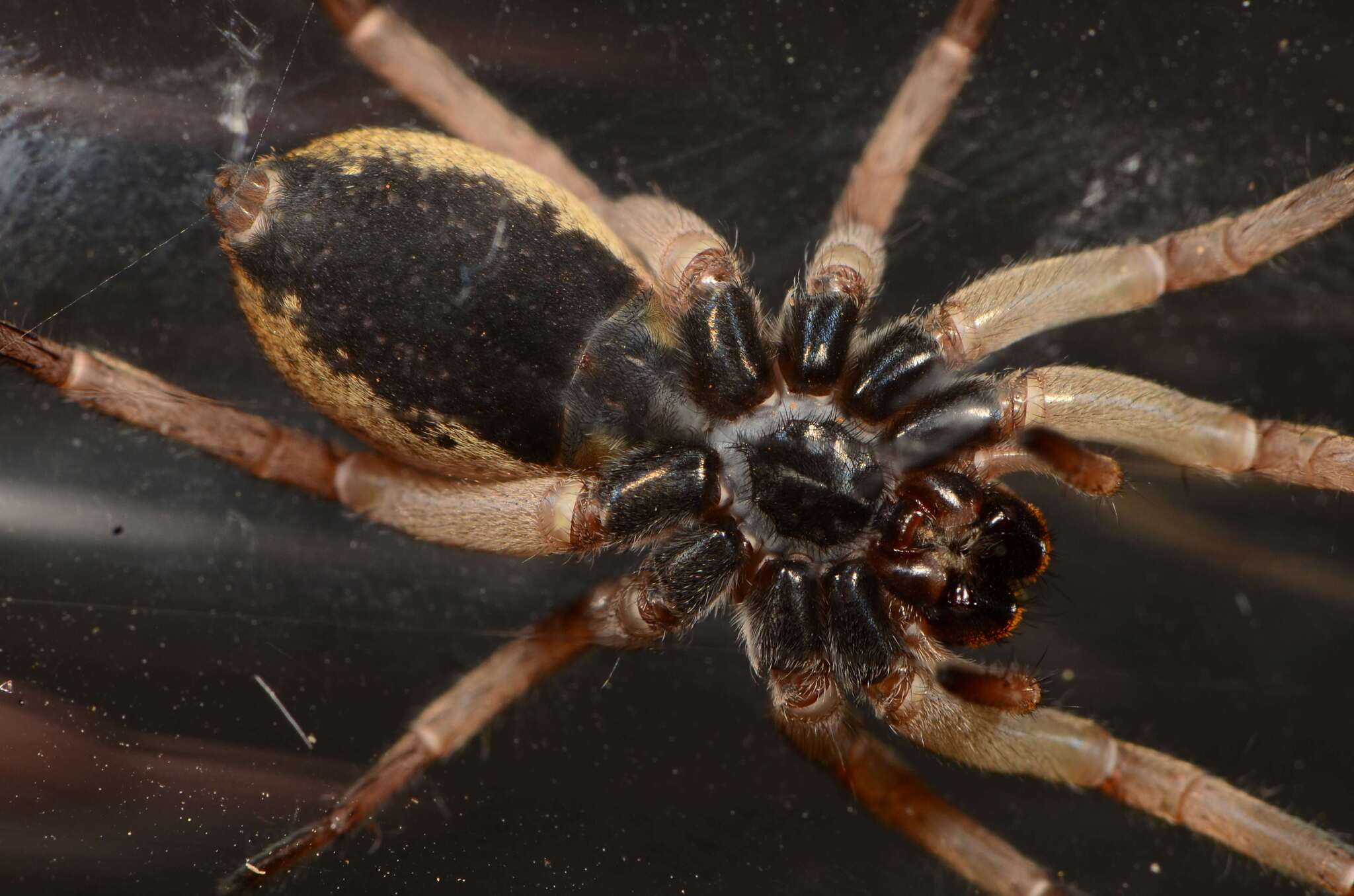
female, ventral view

Hogna lawrencei is known only from females.

The cephalothorax has a rusty yellow eye field that is finely bordered with black, without traces of light longitudinal bands. The eye area is dark.

Dorsally, it is uniformly pale in the midfield, with a hardly distinct, blurred, light-colored wedge mark at the front median and no further markings behind. The abdomen is ventrally pale yellow, but the epigyne area is black.

The sternum and coxae are pale yellow, while other leg segments are rust yellow and not darker ringed. The chelicerae are red-brown and frontally yellowish hairy.

== Conservation ==
The species has a large geographic range and is protected in Faerie Glen Nature Reserve, Klipriviersberg Nature Reserve, Ndumo Game Reserve, and Tembe Elephant Park.

== Etymology ==
The species is named after Reginald Frederick Lawrence, a South African arachnologist who made significant contributions to the study of southern African spiders.

== Taxonomy ==
The species was originally described by Roewer in 1960 as Lycorma lawrencei from Kimberley in the Northern Cape.
