= Anyphops transvaalicus =

Transvaal Anyphops Flat Spider

Conservation status
- Least Concern (SANBI Red List)

Scientific classification
- Kingdom: Animalia
- Phylum: Arthropoda
- Subphylum: Chelicerata
- Class: Arachnida
- Order: Araneae
- Infraorder: Araneomorphae
- Family: Selenopidae
- Genus: Anyphops
- Species: A. transvaalicus

Binomial name
- Anyphops transvaalicus (Lawrence, 1940)

Species of spider

Anyphops transvaalicus is a species of spider in the family Selenopidae. It is endemic to South Africa and is commonly known as the Transvaal Anyphops flat spider.

== Distribution ==
Anyphops transvaalicus is found only in Mpumalanga province of South Africa, where it has been recorded from Komatipoort, Lydenburg, and Lydenburg Sterkspruit.

== Habitat and ecology ==
The species inhabits the Grassland and Savanna biomes at altitudes ranging from 163 to 1,415 m above sea level. These are free-living cryptozoic nocturnal ground living spiders.

== Description ==
Anyphops transvaalicus is known from only the female. The carapace is reddish brown, with the cephalic portion hardly darker than the rest and bearing a trident-shaped marking in the middle behind the median eyes. The thoracic portion has ill-defined radiations of the striae, each bearing a blackish dot in the middle, and a few brown dots near the marginal border which is not well defined.

The abdomen has some large ill-defined blackish-brown markings above. Legs have weak and ill-defined dark bands. The anterior tibiae have 6 pairs of inferior spines. Total length is 11.4 mm.

== Conservation ==
Anyphops transvaalicus is listed as Least Concern by the South African National Biodiversity Institute, as much natural habitat remains within its range and it is likely to be undersampled.

== Taxonomy ==
The species was originally described by Reginald Frederick Lawrence in 1940 as Selenops transvaalicus from Lydenburg. It was later transferred to the genus Anyphops by Benoit in 1968. The species was last revised by Benoit in 1968.
