= Anyphops alticola =

Scientific classification
- Kingdom: Animalia
- Phylum: Arthropoda
- Subphylum: Chelicerata
- Class: Arachnida
- Order: Araneae
- Infraorder: Araneomorphae
- Family: Selenopidae
- Genus: Anyphops
- Species: A. alticola

Binomial name
- Anyphops alticola (Lawrence, 1940)

Species of spider

Anyphops alticola is a species of spider in the family Selenopidae. It is endemic to South Africa.

== Distribution ==
Anyphops alticola is found in South Africa. The species occurs in KwaZulu-Natal and Mpumalanga provinces, with localities including Ingwavuma, Richards Bay and Groblersdal, at altitudes ranging from 27 to 928 m above sea level.

== Habitat and ecology ==
The species inhabits forested and grassland areas in the Indian Ocean Coastal Belt and Savanna biomes. These are free-living cryptozoic nocturnal spiders that live on the soil surface. One specimen was also collected from a house in Richards Bay.

== Description ==
The species is known only from males. The carapace is light brown with some darker patches along the lateral margins, with eyes surrounded by black. The chelicerae are reddish brown, darker than the carapace, with the inner half of their anterior surfaces blackish brown. The opisthosoma is brown, variegated with some minute light dots and blackish markings.

The legs have very weak bands and spots, the strongest being a longitudinal bar near the base of the infero-anterior surface of femur I and II. Anterior tibiae have 5 pairs of rather weak inferior spines, with no lateral or superior spines. Anterior metatarsi have 3 pairs of inferior spines and no lateral spines. Total length is 6-8 mm.

== Conservation ==
Anyphops alticola is listed as Data Deficient due to taxonomic reasons. The status of the species remains obscure and more sampling is needed to collect females and determine the species' range. Threats to the species are unknown.

== Taxonomy ==
The species was originally described by R. F. Lawrence in 1940 as Selenops alticolus from Ingwavuma. It was transferred to the genus Anyphops by Benoit in 1968.
