= Anyphops regalis =

Scientific classification
- Kingdom: Animalia
- Phylum: Arthropoda
- Subphylum: Chelicerata
- Class: Arachnida
- Order: Araneae
- Infraorder: Araneomorphae
- Family: Selenopidae
- Genus: Anyphops
- Species: A. regalis

Binomial name
- Anyphops regalis (Lawrence, 1940)

Synonyms
- Selenops regalis Lawrence, 1940

Species of spider

Anyphops regalis is a species of spider in the family Selenopidae. It is endemic to the Western Cape, South Africa.

== Distribution ==
Anyphops regalis is found in the Western Cape, South Africa. The species occurs at altitudes ranging from 45 to 243 m above sea level. Known locations include Knysna and Groeneweide Forest Station Groenkop northeast of George.

== Habitat and ecology ==
The species inhabits the Forest biome. Anyphops regalis are free-living cryptozoic nocturnal ground-dwelling spiders.

== Description ==
Anyphops regalis is known only from the female. The carapace is brown, with a roughly circular patch in the middle of the posterior half much lighter, and a few fine radiations from the thoracic stria. The eyes are surrounded by a blackened area. The mouthparts are dark.

The abdomen above is mottled brown. All legs have well-defined dark bands on both femora and tibiae. The anterior tibiae have 6, anterior metatarsi have 3 pairs of inferior spines. The total length is 12 mm.

== Conservation ==
Anyphops regalis is listed as Data Deficient for taxonomic reasons. The status of the species remains obscure and additional sampling is needed to collect males and determine the species' range. The species is partly protected in Groeneweide Forest Station, but threats are unknown.

== Taxonomy ==
The species was originally described by Reginald Frederick Lawrence in 1940 as Selenops regalis from Knysna. It was transferred to the genus Anyphops by Benoit in 1968.
