= Anyphops braunsi =

Willowmore Anyphops Flat Spider

Conservation status
- Least Concern (SANBI Red List)

Scientific classification
- Kingdom: Animalia
- Phylum: Arthropoda
- Subphylum: Chelicerata
- Class: Arachnida
- Order: Araneae
- Infraorder: Araneomorphae
- Family: Selenopidae
- Genus: Anyphops
- Species: A. braunsi

Binomial name
- Anyphops braunsi (Lawrence, 1940)

Species of spider

Anyphops braunsi is a species of spider in the family Selenopidae. It is endemic to South Africa and is commonly known as the Willowmore anyphops flat spider.

== Distribution ==
Anyphops braunsi is found in South Africa. The species occurs in the Eastern Cape and Mpumalanga provinces, at altitudes ranging from 62 to 1050 m above sea level.

== Habitat and ecology ==
The species inhabits Forest, Savanna, and Thicket biomes. These are free-living cryptozoic nocturnal ground dwellers. Different species frequently occur sympatrically but occupy different microhabitats. The species has been collected on the ground in a pine plantation at Sabie, South Africa.

== Description ==
The species is known only from females. The carapace is light reddish brown, thoracic striae well defined, with some fine lines radiating from it, and a line from the striae bisecting the cephalic area and bifurcating behind the anterior median eyes. The chelicerae are a little darker than the carapace.

The opisthosoma is rubbed, yellow above but with some darker spots and blotches above the spinners. The legs have dark bands. Tibia I and II have 6, metatarsus I and II have 3 pairs of inferior spines. Total length is 12 mm.

== Conservation ==
Anyphops braunsi is listed as Least Concern due to its wide geographical range. Threats to the species are unknown. It is protected in Baviaanskloof Nature Reserve and Bergvliet Forest Station.

== Taxonomy ==
The species was originally described by R. F. Lawrence in 1940 as Selenops braunsi from Willowmore in the Eastern Cape. It was transferred to the genus Anyphops by Benoit in 1968.
