= Anyphops fitzsimonsi =

Mpumalanga Anyphops Flat Spider

Conservation status
- Least Concern (SANBI Red List)

Scientific classification
- Kingdom: Animalia
- Phylum: Arthropoda
- Subphylum: Chelicerata
- Class: Arachnida
- Order: Araneae
- Infraorder: Araneomorphae
- Family: Selenopidae
- Genus: Anyphops
- Species: A. fitzsimonsi

Binomial name
- Anyphops fitzsimonsi (Lawrence, 1940)

Species of spider

Anyphops fitzsimonsi is a species of spider in the family Selenopidae. It is endemic to South Africa and is commonly known as Mpumalanga Anyphops flat spider.

== Distribution ==
Anyphops fitzsimonsi occurs in three South African provinces: Gauteng, Mpumalanga, and North West. Notable localities include Barberton, Nelspruit, Pretoria, and the Lowveld National Botanical Garden.

== Habitat and ecology ==
The species inhabits Savanna and Grassland biomes at altitudes ranging from 270 to 1394 m above sea level. These are free-living cryptozoic nocturnal spiders that have been sampled from trees in avocado, macadamia and citrus orchards and commercial pine plantations. Specimens have also been found in houses.

== Description ==
Known only from the male. The carapace is yellow-brown without radiations from thoracic striae, with a lighter parallel-sided broad yellow area behind the eyes as wide as the ocular row, bisected by the striae which continues as a brown stripe onto the cephalic region.

The broad median area of carapace is bordered at the sides by a wavy brown line, and the eyes are black. The opisthosoma is yellow above with a few indistinct brown markings, while the under surface and legs are yellow without black bands. The anterior tibiae have 6 pairs of inferior spines.

Total length is 8.6 mm.

== Conservation ==
Anyphops fitzsimonsi is listed as Least Concern due to its wide geographical range. The species receives protection in the Lowveld National Botanical Garden and Bergvliet State Forest.

== Taxonomy ==
The species was originally described by Lawrence in 1940 as Selenops fitzsimonsi from Barberton in Mpumalanga. It was later transferred to the genus Anyphops by Benoit in 1968.
