= Anyphops thornei =

Scientific classification
- Kingdom: Animalia
- Phylum: Arthropoda
- Subphylum: Chelicerata
- Class: Arachnida
- Order: Araneae
- Infraorder: Araneomorphae
- Family: Selenopidae
- Genus: Anyphops
- Species: A. thornei

Binomial name
- Anyphops thornei (Lawrence, 1940)

Species of spider

Anyphops thornei is a species of spider in the family Selenopidae. It is endemic to the Western Cape of South Africa.

== Distribution ==
Anyphops thornei is found in the Western Cape province of South Africa, primarily in the Cederberg Wilderness Area and surrounding regions including Vredenburg.

== Habitat and ecology ==
The species inhabits the Fynbos biome at altitudes ranging from 78 to 1,576 m above sea level. These are free-living cryptozoic nocturnal ground living spiders.

== Description ==
Anyphops thornei is known from only the female. The carapace is light yellow-brown with a broad margin on each side a little darker. Thoracic striae and boundaries of cephalic area are clearly defined.

The abdomen is infuscate above, becoming darker posteriorly, with a narrow median light stripe in anterior two thirds and two small, well-defined, circular, whitish patches above the spinnerets, each containing a minute brown dot. The tibiae I and II have 5 pairs of weak inferior spines, and the metatarsi I and II have 3 pairs of inferior spines. Total length is 7.3 mm.

== Conservation ==
Anyphops thornei is listed as Data Deficient for taxonomic reasons, as more sampling is needed to collect the male and determine the species' range. The species is protected in the Cederberg Wilderness Area.

== Taxonomy ==
The species was originally described by Reginald Frederick Lawrence in 1940 as Selenops thornei from the Cedarberg. It was later transferred to the genus Anyphops by Benoit in 1968. The species was last revised by Benoit in 1968.
