= Anyphops pococki =

Lydenburg Anyphops Flat Spider

Conservation status
- Least Concern (SANBI Red List)

Scientific classification
- Kingdom: Animalia
- Phylum: Arthropoda
- Subphylum: Chelicerata
- Class: Arachnida
- Order: Araneae
- Infraorder: Araneomorphae
- Family: Selenopidae
- Genus: Anyphops
- Species: A. pococki

Binomial name
- Anyphops pococki (Lawrence, 1940)

Synonyms
- Selenops pococki Lawrence, 1940

Species of spider

Anyphops pococki is a species of spider in the family Selenopidae. It is endemic to South Africa and is commonly known as the Lydenburg Anyphops flat spider.

== Distribution ==
Anyphops pococki is found in South Africa across three provinces: KwaZulu-Natal, Mpumalanga, and North West. The species occurs at altitudes ranging from 91 to 1742 m above sea level. Notable locations include Ophathe Game Reserve and Tembe Elephant Park in KwaZulu-Natal, Lydenburg and Warburton Jessievale Forest Station in Mpumalanga, and Rietfontein Brits in North West.

== Habitat and ecology ==
The species inhabits Grassland and Savanna biomes. Anyphops pococki are free-living cryptozoic nocturnal spiders that are commonly found under bark of trees.

== Description ==
Anyphops pococki is known only from the male. The carapace is dark brown with numerous darker spots and radiations, with the ocular area black. The chelicerae are slightly darker than the carapace.

The abdomen is yellow with blackish-brown symmetrical markings. The legs have ill-defined markings, with those of the femora strongest and those of the posterior legs almost obsolete. Tibia I and II have 5 pairs of inferior spines, 2 lateral spines on each side, and 3 superior spines. Metatarsus I and II have 3 pairs of inferior spines and 2 lateral spines on each side. The total length is 9.4 mm.

== Conservation ==
Anyphops pococki is listed as Least Concern due to its wide geographical range across three provinces. The species is protected in three protected areas: Ophathe Game Reserve, Tembe Elephant Park, and Jessievale Forest Station. Additional sampling is needed to collect females and determine the species' current range. There are no known threats to the species.

== Taxonomy ==
The species was originally described by Reginald Frederick Lawrence in 1940 as Selenops pococki from Lydenburg. It was transferred to the genus Anyphops by Benoit in 1968.
