= Anyphops decoratus =

Zululand Anyphops Flat Spider

Conservation status
- Least Concern (SANBI Red List)

Scientific classification
- Kingdom: Animalia
- Phylum: Arthropoda
- Subphylum: Chelicerata
- Class: Arachnida
- Order: Araneae
- Infraorder: Araneomorphae
- Family: Selenopidae
- Genus: Anyphops
- Species: A. decoratus

Binomial name
- Anyphops decoratus (Lawrence, 1940)

Species of spider

Anyphops decoratus is a species of spider in the family Selenopidae. It is endemic to South Africa and is commonly known as the Zululand anyphops flat spider.

== Distribution ==
Anyphops decoratus is found in South Africa. The species occurs in four provinces: Eastern Cape, KwaZulu-Natal, Limpopo, and Mpumalanga, at altitudes ranging from 29 to 1245 m above sea level.

== Habitat and ecology ==
The species inhabits Forest, Indian Ocean Coastal Belt, and Savanna biomes. These are free-living cryptozoic nocturnal spiders.

== Description ==
The species is known from both sexes. The carapace is brown, narrowly margined with black, decorated with spots and short bars of black, including a row of black spots along the lateral margin, and a large one on each side of the stria along the posterior margin. The chelicerae are brown, with their inner margins black and a black dot on the outer side near the base.

The opisthosoma is mottled with black spots and bars, creating a dark brown overall effect. All legs have very clearly defined black blotches and bands. The posterior surfaces of femora are white, and metatarsi have 2 distinct black bands. Anterior tibiae have 7 pairs of inferior spines. Total length is 6-9 mm.

== Conservation ==
Anyphops decoratus is listed as Least Concern due to the wide geographical range. There are no known threats to the species. It is protected in three reserves, Tembe Elephant Park, uMkhuze Game Reserve, and Lekgalameetse Nature Reserve.

== Taxonomy ==
The species was originally described by R. F. Lawrence in 1940 as Selenops decoratus from Ingwavuma. It was transferred to the genus Anyphops by Benoit in 1968.
