= Anyphops bechuanicus =

Scientific classification
- Kingdom: Animalia
- Phylum: Arthropoda
- Subphylum: Chelicerata
- Class: Arachnida
- Order: Araneae
- Infraorder: Araneomorphae
- Family: Selenopidae
- Genus: Anyphops
- Species: A. bechuanicus

Binomial name
- Anyphops bechuanicus (Lawrence, 1940)

Species of spider

Anyphops bechuanicus is a species of spider in the family Selenopidae. It is endemic to South Africa.

== Distribution ==
Anyphops bechuanicus is found in South Africa. The species occurs in KwaZulu-Natal and North West provinces, at altitudes ranging from 71 to 1218 m above sea level.

== Habitat and ecology ==
The species inhabits the Savanna and Indian Ocean Coastal Belt biomes. These are free-living cryptozoic nocturnal ground dwellers.

== Description ==
A. bechuanicus is known from both sexes. The carapace is yellow-brown, narrowly bordered with black and variegated with symmetrical brown markings, with an oval patch on each side of the thoracic striae. The mouthparts are light yellow-brown, with a narrow inner and outer dark stripe on their anterior surfaces.

The opisthosoma is yellow-brown with indistinct symmetrical markings. The legs have distinct dark bands, those of the femora mottled and irregular, and those of the tibiae clearly defined. Tibia I and II have 5, metatarsus I and II have 3 pairs of inferior spines. Total length is 9.5 mm.

== Conservation ==
Anyphops bechuanicus is listed as Data Deficient. The species is under sampled and more sampling is needed to determine the species' range. Threats to the species are unknown.

== Taxonomy ==
The species was originally described by R. F. Lawrence in 1940 as Selenops bechuanicus from Vryburg in the North West. It was transferred to the genus Anyphops by Benoit in 1968.
