= Anyphops purcelli =

Scientific classification
- Kingdom: Animalia
- Phylum: Arthropoda
- Subphylum: Chelicerata
- Class: Arachnida
- Order: Araneae
- Infraorder: Araneomorphae
- Family: Selenopidae
- Genus: Anyphops
- Species: A. purcelli

Binomial name
- Anyphops purcelli (Lawrence, 1940)

Synonyms
- Selenops purcelli Lawrence, 1940

Species of spider

Anyphops purcelli is a species of spider in the family Selenopidae. It is endemic to South Africa.

== Distribution ==
Anyphops purcelli is found in South Africa in the Eastern Cape and Western Cape provinces. The species occurs at altitudes ranging from 1 to 222 m above sea level. Known locations include Mkambati Nature Reserve in the Eastern Cape and Montagu Baths in the Western Cape.

== Habitat and ecology ==
The species inhabits Fynbos, Grassland, and Indian Ocean Coastal Belt biomes. Anyphops purcelli are free-living cryptozoic nocturnal ground-dwelling spiders.

== Description ==
Anyphops purcelli is known only from the female. The type specimen is faded. The carapace is yellow brown with a blackish marginal border. The thoracic striae are brown, with a number of short blackish stripes near the lateral margins directed towards but not connected with the striae. The cephalic portion is defined posteriorly by a blackish V-shaped marking.

The abdomen is blackish brown above, rather rubbed, but with a clearly defined broad V-shaped marking above the spinnerets. The legs have large black blotches on the antero-inferior surfaces of the anterior femora, and wide brown bands on the tibiae, with these markings becoming fainter in the posterior legs. Tibia I and II have 5, metatarsus I and II have 3 pairs of inferior spines. The total length is 8 mm.

== Conservation ==
Anyphops purcelli is listed as Data Deficient for taxonomic reasons. The status of the species remains obscure and additional sampling is needed to collect males and determine the species' range. The species is protected in Mkambati Nature Reserve, but threats are unknown.

== Taxonomy ==
The species was originally described by Reginald Frederick Lawrence in 1940 as Selenops purcelli from Montagu Bath in the Western Cape. It was transferred to the genus Anyphops by Benoit in 1968.
