= Anyphops reservatus =

Hluhluwe Anyphops Flat Spider

Conservation status
- Least Concern (SANBI Red List)

Scientific classification
- Kingdom: Animalia
- Phylum: Arthropoda
- Subphylum: Chelicerata
- Class: Arachnida
- Order: Araneae
- Infraorder: Araneomorphae
- Family: Selenopidae
- Genus: Anyphops
- Species: A. reservatus

Binomial name
- Anyphops reservatus (Lawrence, 1937)

Synonyms
- Selenops reservatus Lawrence, 1937

Species of spider

Anyphops reservatus is a species of spider in the family Selenopidae. It is endemic to South Africa and is commonly known as the Hluhluwe Anyphops flat spider.

== Distribution ==
Anyphops reservatus is found in South Africa in KwaZulu-Natal and Limpopo provinces. The species occurs at altitudes ranging from 51 to 1148 m above sea level. Notable locations include Hluhluwe and Hluhluwe Nature Reserve, iSimangaliso Wetland Park at Kosi Bay and uMkhuze Game Reserve in KwaZulu-Natal, and Warmbaths Klein Kariba and Soutpansberg Hanglip Forest in Limpopo.

== Habitat and ecology ==
The species inhabits Forest, Indian Ocean Coastal Belt, and Savanna biomes. Anyphops reservatus are free-living cryptozoic nocturnal ground-dwelling spiders.

== Description ==
Anyphops reservatus is known only from the female. The carapace is pale, covered with white and yellow hairs and without dark markings.

The abdomen dorsally is pale, almost yellow, covered with yellow, white and reddish hairs, with a few darker ones. There are no distinct pattern markings. The sides of the abdomen become progressively darker posteriorly.

The legs have femora that are yellow with a few darker spots, with all remaining segments light yellow, punctuated with small dark brown spots. The tibia and tarsus of the pedipalp have an indistinct dark basal band. The total length is 11.5 mm.

== Conservation ==
Anyphops reservatus is listed as Least Concern due to its wide geographical range across two provinces. The species is protected in uMkhuze Game Reserve and Hluhluwe Nature Reserve. Additional sampling is needed to collect males and determine the species' range. There are no known threats to the species.

== Taxonomy ==
The species was originally described by Reginald Frederick Lawrence in 1937 as Selenops reservatus from Hluhluwe Game Reserve. It was transferred to the genus Anyphops by Benoit in 1968.
