= Anyphops tuckeri =

Tucker's Anyphops Flat Spider

Conservation status
- Least Concern (SANBI Red List)

Scientific classification
- Kingdom: Animalia
- Phylum: Arthropoda
- Subphylum: Chelicerata
- Class: Arachnida
- Order: Araneae
- Infraorder: Araneomorphae
- Family: Selenopidae
- Genus: Anyphops
- Species: A. tuckeri

Binomial name
- Anyphops tuckeri (Lawrence, 1940)

Species of spider

Anyphops tuckeri is a species of spider in the family Selenopidae. It is endemic to South Africa and is commonly known as Tucker's Anyphops flat spider.

== Distribution ==
Anyphops tuckeri is found across six provinces of South Africa: Eastern Cape, Free State, Gauteng, Limpopo, Mpumalanga, and North West. The species is recorded from numerous locations including four protected areas such as Roodeplaatdam Nature Reserve, Tswaing Crater Nature Reserve, Mosdene Nature Reserve, and Rustenburg Nature Reserve.

== Habitat and ecology ==
The species inhabits multiple biomes including Forest, Grassland, and Savanna biomes at altitudes ranging from 219 to 1,579 m above sea level. These are free-living cryptozoic nocturnal spiders that have also been found in buildings.

== Description ==
Anyphops tuckeri is known from only the female. The carapace is light reddish brown with indistinct markings, with thoracic striae and sides of the cephalic area darker. A faint stripe occurs in the middle of the cephalic area bifurcating halfway between the eyes and the stria, and eyes are surrounded by black areas.

The abdomen is light yellow with symmetrical brown markings. The tibiae I and II have 6 pairs, and the metatarsi I and II have 3 pairs of long inferior spines. Total length is 10.3 mm.

== Conservation ==
Anyphops tuckeri is listed as Least Concern by the South African National Biodiversity Institute due to its wide geographical range. The species is protected in Roodeplaatdam Nature Reserve, Tswaing Crater Nature Reserve, Mosdene Nature Reserve, and Rustenburg Nature Reserve.

== Taxonomy ==
The species was originally described by Reginald Frederick Lawrence in 1940 as Selenops tuckeri from the Junction at Crocodile and Marico Rivers in North West. It was later transferred to the genus Anyphops by Benoit in 1968. The species was last revised by Benoit in 1968.
