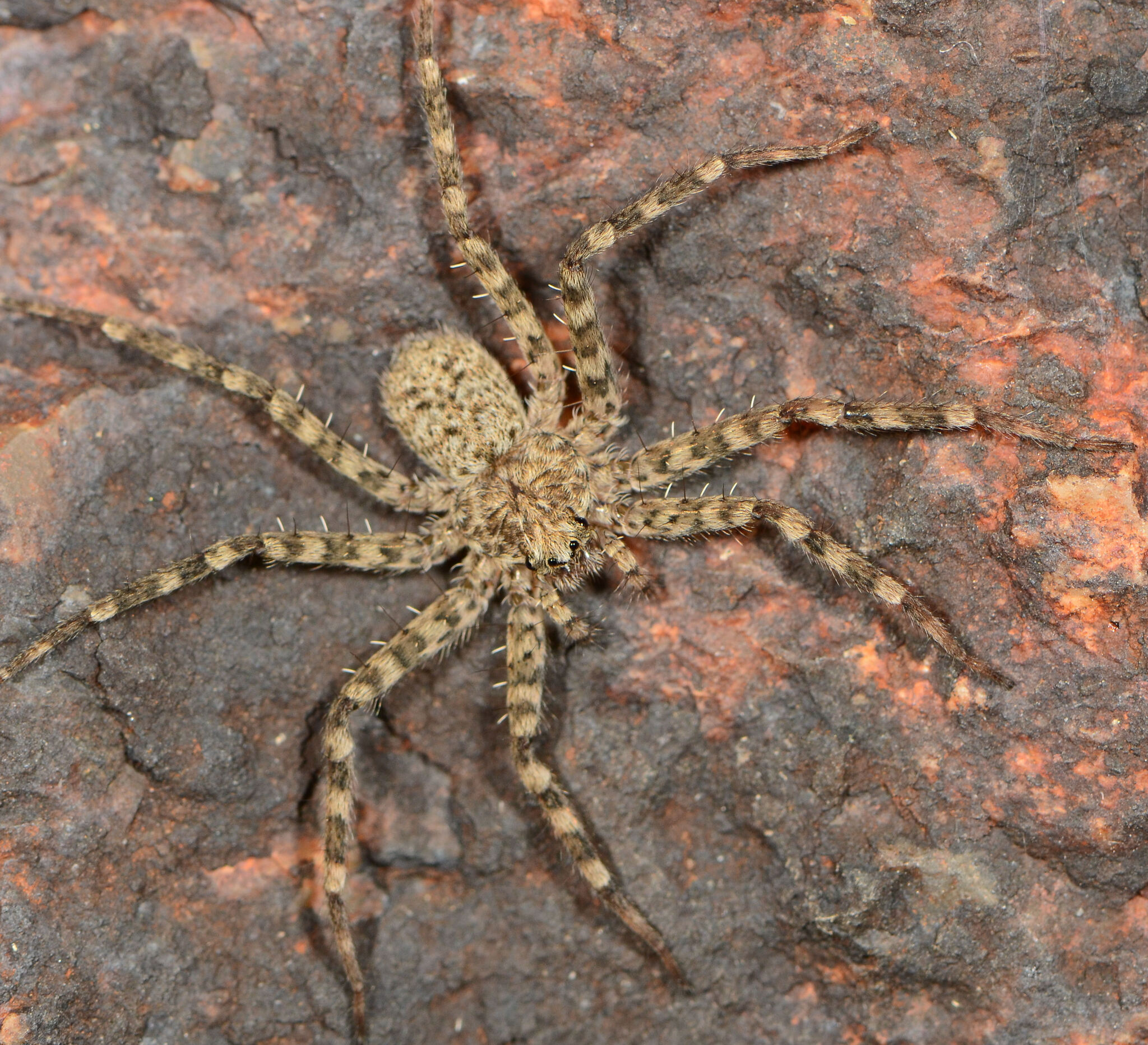
- Female A. broomi
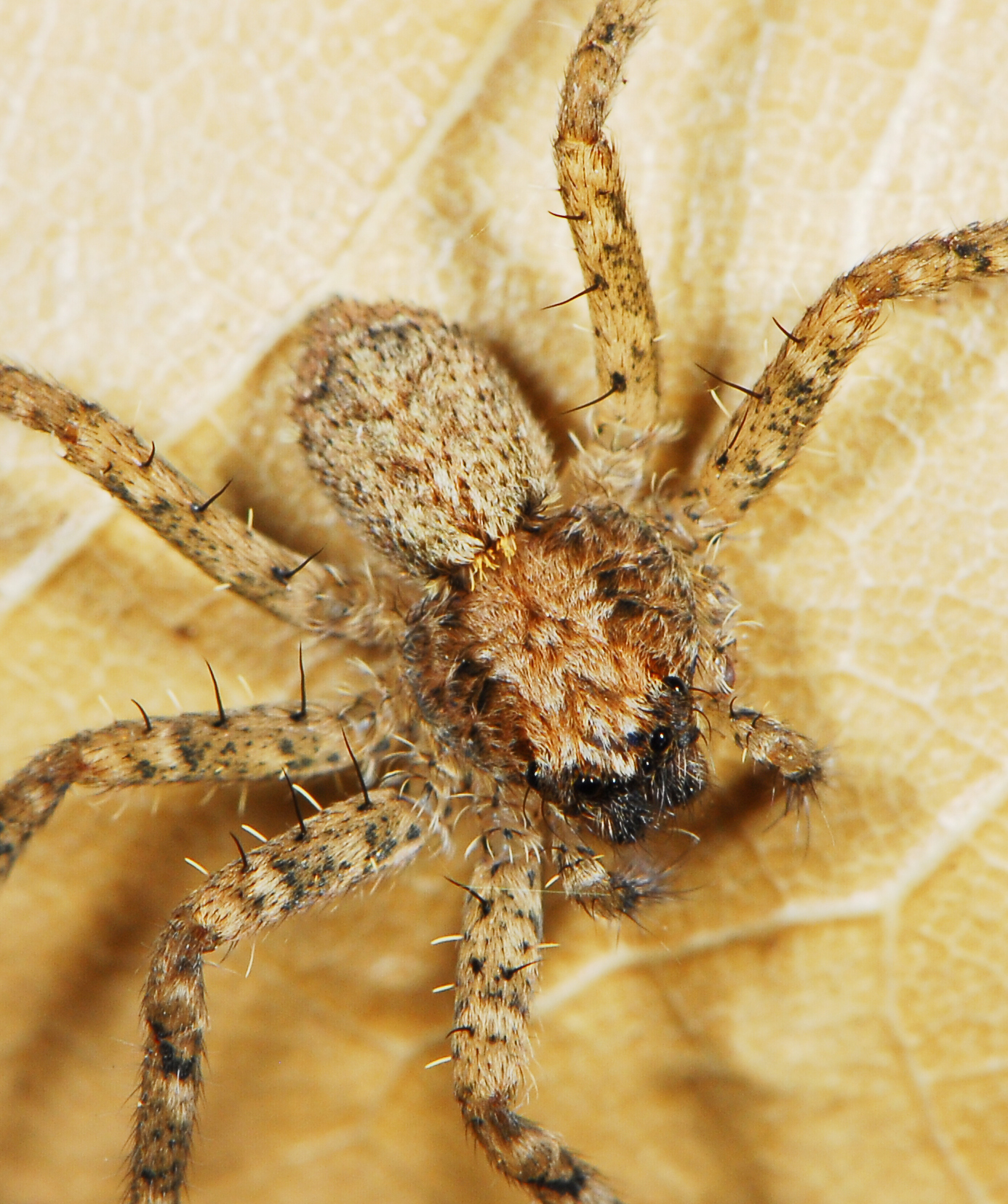
- Female A. barbertonensis

Scientific classification
- Kingdom: Animalia
- Phylum: Arthropoda
- Subphylum: Chelicerata
- Class: Arachnida
- Order: Araneae
- Infraorder: Araneomorphae
- Family: Selenopidae
- Genus: Anyphops; Benoit, 1968

Type species
- A. atomarius (Simon, 1887)

Species
- 64, see text

= Anyphops =

Genus of spiders

Anyphops is an African genus of wall spiders that was first described by Benoit in 1968.

== Distribution ==
Most species are endemic to southern Africa, with almost sixty described species only found in South Africa. One species is endemic to Madagascar, and a few species are described from Cameroon and the DR Congo.

== Life style ==
Members of this genus are free-living cryptozoic nocturnal spiders.

== Description ==
Small to large (6–23 mm) spiders. Anyphops differs from other selenopid genera in the arrangement of the eyes, the number of ventral spines on tibiae I – II, the shape of the median apophysis of the male palp, the general structure of the female epigynum and the leg formulae.

Carapace flattened; subcircular; usually brown to reddish brown, with lateral dark bands or spots; chelicerae brown to orange, normally with black or grey bands; labium and sternum usually paler in colour; anterior median eyes and posterior median eyes are in a strongly recurved line; posterior median eyes larger than anterior median eyes; posterior lateral eyes the largest, anterior lateral eyes the smallest.

Abdomen flattened, round to oval; clothed in dense setae; normally grey or yellowish with brown or black dorsal defined patterns; venter yellowish, without markings.

Leg two claws with claw tufts and scopulae; laterigrade; anterior legs provided with strong, four to seven pairs of ventral spines on tibiae and metatarsi I and II; tarsal claws smooth; formulae normally 4321. Male palp with a retrolateral tibial apophysis with two branches similar in size or the dorsal longer than the ventral.

Female epigynum with a middle field reduced or well developed, represented by a depression or a septum, the lateral lobes of the epigynum well distinguished or not and, in very few cases, with slight secondary epigyneal pockets.

== Taxonomy ==
The genus Anyphops was established by Benoit in 1968 when he reclassified African members of the family Selenopidae. The type species is Anyphops atomarius (Simon, 1887), originally described as Selenops atomarius. Most species in the genus were originally described in the genus Selenops by various authors including Lawrence (1940), Pocock (1900, 1901), and Simon (1887), before being transferred to Anyphops by Benoit in 1968. The genus is part of a broader reclassification of African selenopid spiders north of the 17th parallel south.

== Species ==
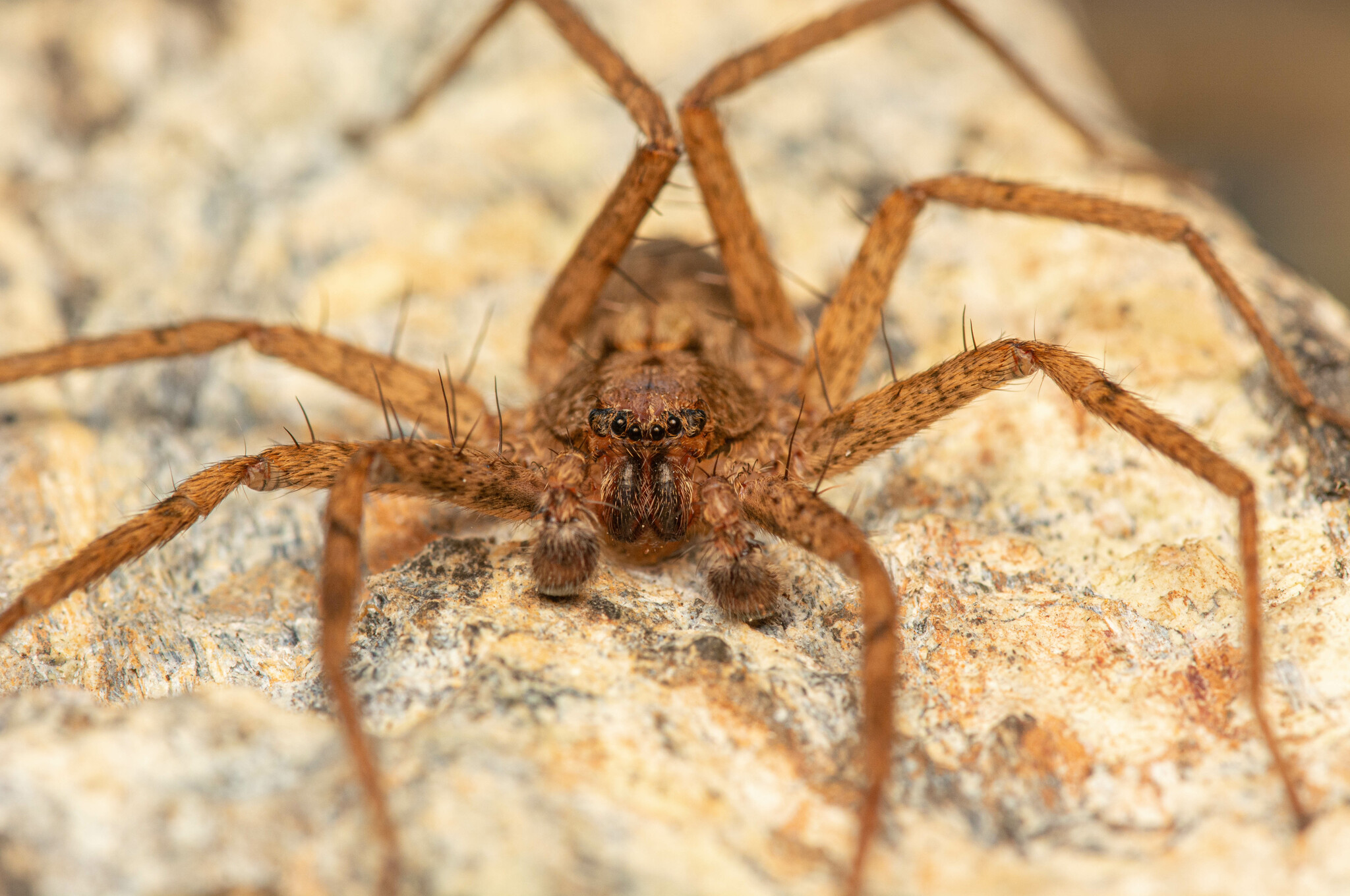
male A. immaculatus

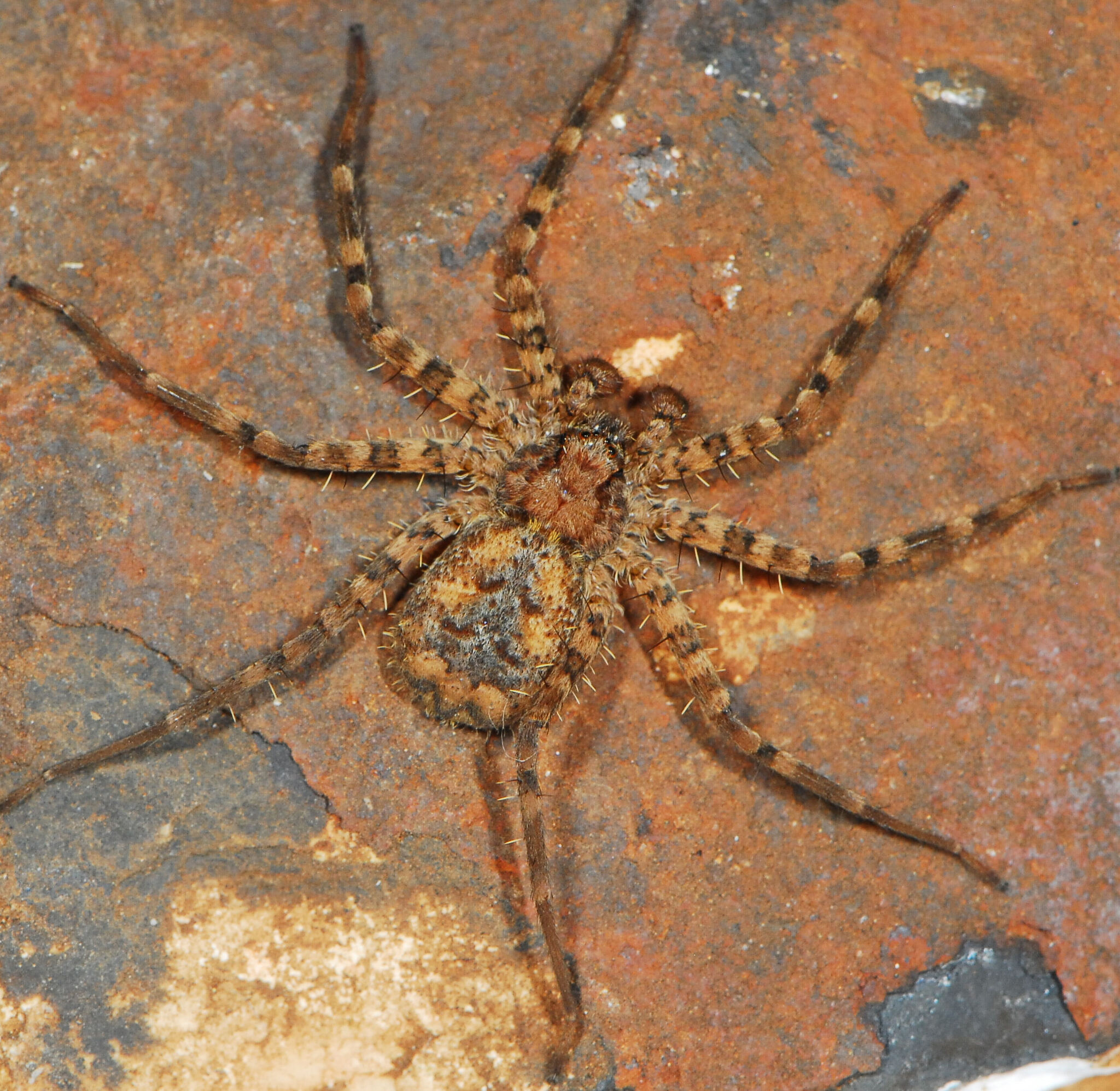
male A. lawrencei

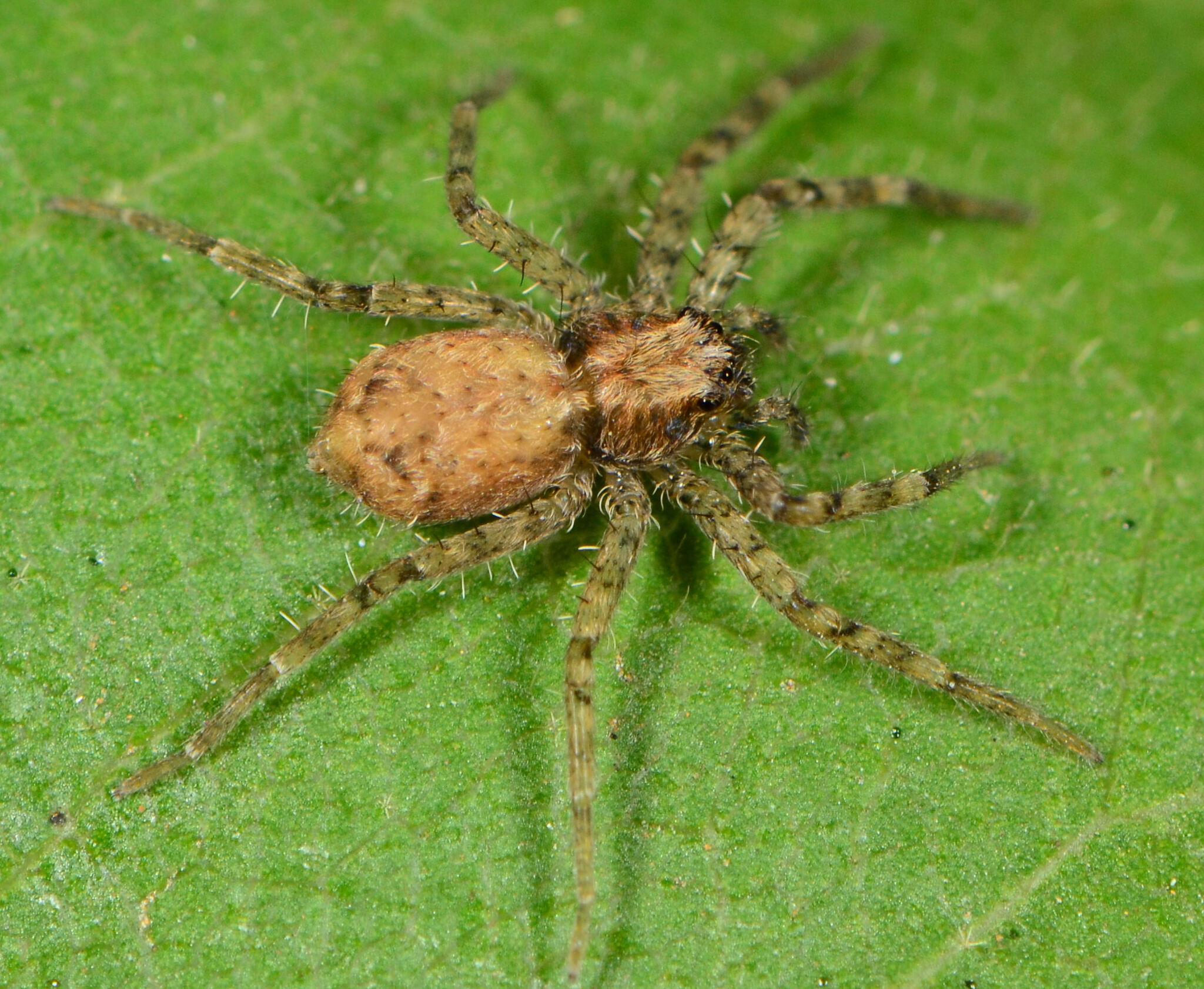
female A. lucia

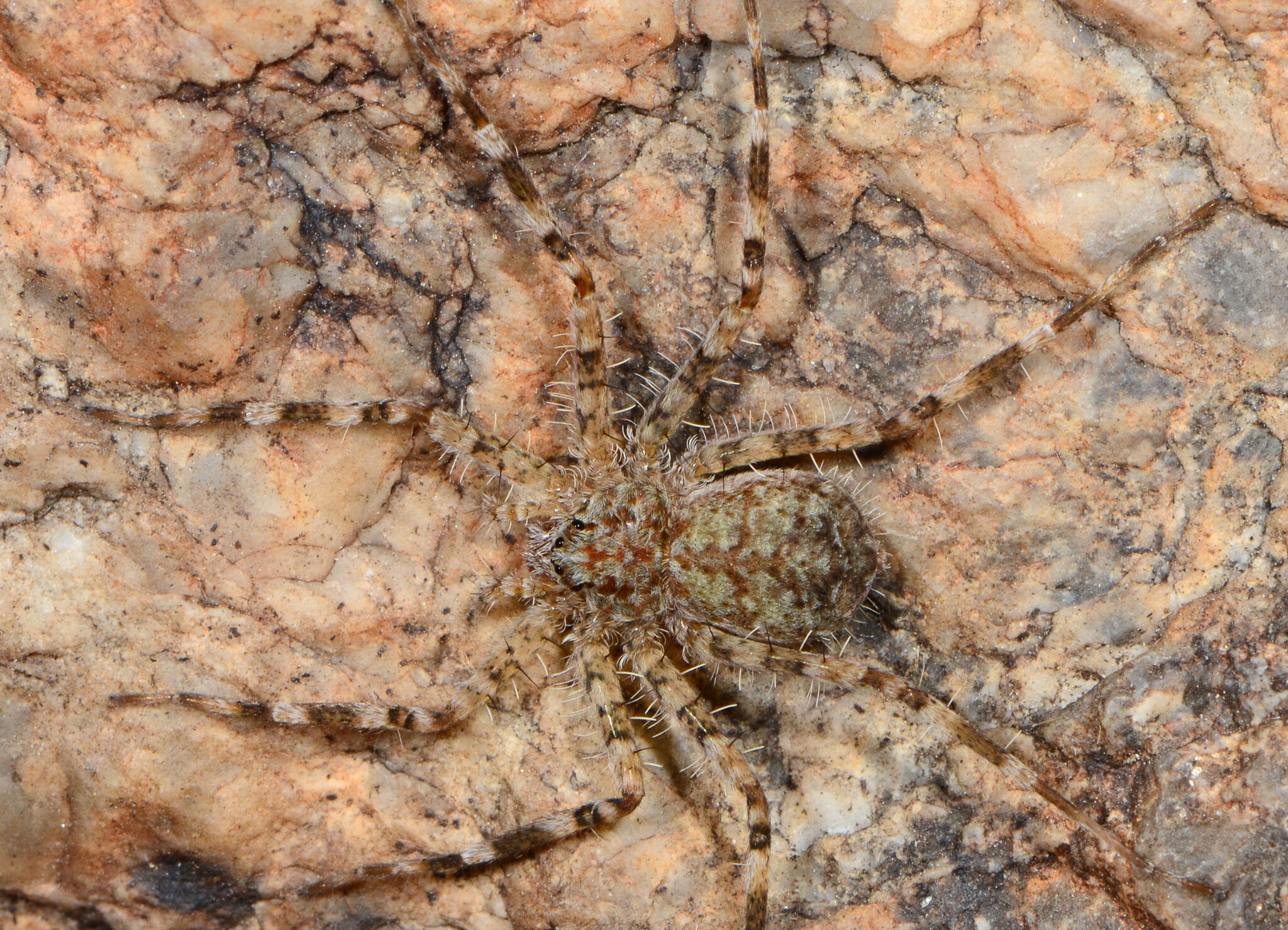
female A. marshalli

As of September 2025, this genus includes 64 species:

- Anyphops alticola (Lawrence, 1940) – South Africa
- Anyphops amatolae (Lawrence, 1940) – South Africa
- Anyphops atomarius (Simon, 1887) – South Africa (type species)
- Anyphops barbertonensis (Lawrence, 1940) – South Africa, Eswatini
- Anyphops barnardi (Lawrence, 1940) – Zimbabwe, Mozambique, South Africa
- Anyphops basutus (Pocock, 1901) – South Africa, Lesotho
- Anyphops bechuanicus (Lawrence, 1940) – South Africa
- Anyphops benoiti Corronca, 1998 – Madagascar
- Anyphops braunsi (Lawrence, 1940) – South Africa
- Anyphops broomi (Pocock, 1900) – South Africa
- Anyphops caledonicus (Lawrence, 1940) – South Africa
- Anyphops capensis (Lawrence, 1940) – South Africa
- Anyphops civicus (Lawrence, 1940) – South Africa
- Anyphops decoratus (Lawrence, 1940) – South Africa
- Anyphops dubiosus (Lawrence, 1952) – South Africa
- Anyphops dulacen Corronca, 2000 – Namibia
- Anyphops fitzsimonsi (Lawrence, 1940) – South Africa
- Anyphops gilli (Lawrence, 1940) – South Africa
- Anyphops helenae (Lawrence, 1940) – South Africa
- Anyphops hessei (Lawrence, 1940) – South Africa
- Anyphops hewitti (Lawrence, 1940) – Namibia, South Africa
- Anyphops immaculatus (Lawrence, 1940) – South Africa
- Anyphops karrooicus (Lawrence, 1940) – South Africa
- Anyphops kivuensis Benoit, 1968 – DR Congo
- Anyphops kraussi (Pocock, 1898) – South Africa
- Anyphops lawrencei (Roewer, 1951) – Zimbabwe, South Africa
- Anyphops leleupi Benoit, 1972 – South Africa
- Anyphops lesserti (Lawrence, 1940) – South Africa
- Anyphops lignicola (Lawrence, 1937) – South Africa
- Anyphops lochiel Corronca, 2000 – South Africa
- Anyphops longipedatus (Roewer, 1955) – South Africa
- Anyphops lucia Corronca, 2005 – South Africa
- Anyphops lycosiformis (Lawrence, 1937) – South Africa
- Anyphops maculosus (Lawrence, 1940) – South Africa
- Anyphops marshalli (Pocock, 1902) – South Africa
- Anyphops minor (Lawrence, 1940) – South Africa
- Anyphops montanus (Lawrence, 1940) – South Africa
- Anyphops mumai (Corronca, 1996) – South Africa
- Anyphops namaquensis (Lawrence, 1940) – South Africa
- Anyphops narcissi Benoit, 1972 – South Africa, Eswatini
- Anyphops natalensis (Lawrence, 1940) – South Africa
- Anyphops ngome Corronca, 2005 – South Africa
- Anyphops parvulus (Pocock, 1900) – South Africa
- Anyphops phallus (Lawrence, 1952) – South Africa
- Anyphops pococki (Lawrence, 1940) – South Africa
- Anyphops purcelli (Lawrence, 1940) – South Africa
- Anyphops regalis (Lawrence, 1940) – South Africa
- Anyphops reservatus (Lawrence, 1937) – South Africa
- Anyphops rubicundus (Lawrence, 1940) – South Africa
- Anyphops schoenlandi (Pocock, 1902) – South Africa
- Anyphops septemspinatus (Lawrence, 1937) – Mozambique, South Africa
- Anyphops septentrionalis Benoit, 1975 – Cameroon
- Anyphops sexspinatus (Lawrence, 1940) – South Africa
- Anyphops silvicolellus (Strand, 1913) – DR Congo, Rwanda, Tanzania, South Africa
- Anyphops smithersi (Lawrence, 1940) – Lesotho
- Anyphops spenceri (Pocock, 1896) – South Africa
- Anyphops sponsae (Lessert, 1933) – Congo, Angola
- Anyphops stauntoni (Pocock, 1902) – St. Helena, South Africa
- Anyphops stridulans (Lawrence, 1940) – South Africa
- Anyphops thornei (Lawrence, 1940) – South Africa
- Anyphops transvaalicus (Lawrence, 1940) – South Africa
- Anyphops tuckeri (Lawrence, 1940) – South Africa
- Anyphops tugelanus (Lawrence, 1942) – South Africa
- Anyphops whiteae (Pocock, 1902) – South Africa
