= Anyphops septemspinatus =

Kosi Bay Anyphops Flat Spider

Conservation status
- Least Concern (SANBI Red List)

Scientific classification
- Kingdom: Animalia
- Phylum: Arthropoda
- Subphylum: Chelicerata
- Class: Arachnida
- Order: Araneae
- Infraorder: Araneomorphae
- Family: Selenopidae
- Genus: Anyphops
- Species: A. septemspinatus

Binomial name
- Anyphops septemspinatus (Lawrence, 1937)

Synonyms
- Selenops septemspinatus Lawrence, 1937

Species of spider

Anyphops septemspinatus is a species of spider in the family Selenopidae. It is found in Mozambique and South Africa and is commonly known as the Kosi Bay Anyphops flat spider.

== Distribution ==
Anyphops septemspinatus is found in southern Africa, specifically in Mozambique and South Africa. In South Africa, the species occurs in KwaZulu-Natal and Limpopo provinces at altitudes ranging from 4 to 1152 m above sea level. Notable locations include iSimangaliso Wetland Park (Hell's Gate, Kosi Bay Nature Reserve, and Fanie's Island), Tembe Elephant Park, Ndumo Game Reserve, Van Reenen, and Estcourt in KwaZulu-Natal, and Sekhukhunelan District Serunecjar-cave in Limpopo.

== Habitat and ecology ==
The species inhabits Grassland, Indian Ocean Coastal Belt, and Savanna biomes. Anyphops septemspinatus are free-living cryptozoic nocturnal spiders. At iSimangaliso Wetland Park they have been sampled from blue tsetse fly traps and under bark. In Limpopo they were sampled from a cave in the twilight zone near the entrance. At Ndumo Game Reserve they are found associated with fever tree bark.

== Description ==
Anyphops septemspinatus is known from both sexes. The carapace at the sides has irregular but distinct black markings. In the middle just anterior to the cephalic striae are two black dots. There is a distinct black spot behind each posterior lateral eye, and another at the sides of these eyes bordering the edge of the carapace.

The chelicerae are yellow, with their inner margins and distal third black, and a black spot on the outer side at their bases.

The abdomen above is mottled with symmetrical dark markings, in the middle roughly chevron-shaped markings, with a white A-shaped marking on each side near the spinnerets. The legs have very black, strongly contrasting markings, with anterior surfaces of femora I and II having 2 irregular very black bands, while posterior surfaces are without markings. Tibial I and II have 7 pairs of inferior spines, metatarsi I and II have 3 pairs.

The total length is 10.4 mm.

== Conservation ==
Anyphops septemspinatus is listed as Least Concern due to its wide geographical range. The species is protected in Tembe Elephant Park, Kosi Bay Nature Reserve, and Ndumo Game Reserve. There are no known threats to the species.

== Taxonomy ==
The species was originally described by Reginald Frederick Lawrence in 1937 as Selenops septemspinatus from Kosi Bay Nature Reserve. It was transferred to the genus Anyphops by Benoit in 1968.
