= Anyphops amatolae =

Scientific classification
- Kingdom: Animalia
- Phylum: Arthropoda
- Subphylum: Chelicerata
- Class: Arachnida
- Order: Araneae
- Infraorder: Araneomorphae
- Family: Selenopidae
- Genus: Anyphops
- Species: A. amatolae

Binomial name
- Anyphops amatolae (Lawrence, 1940)

Species of spider

Anyphops amatolae is a species of spider in the family Selenopidae. It is endemic to South Africa.

== Distribution ==
Anyphops amatolae is found in South Africa. The species is endemic to the Eastern Cape, known only from Hogsback at 1307 m above sea level.

== Habitat and ecology ==
The species inhabits the Forest biome. These are free-living cryptozoic nocturnal ground dwellers.

== Description ==
The species is known from both sexes. The carapace is finely bordered with black, dark brown with long blackish radiations from the thoracic stria, the latter appearing as a wedge-shaped dark marking pointed posteriorly. The chelicerae are similar in colour to the carapace. The opisthosoma above is rubbed.

The femora and tibiae of anterior legs have broad brown bands. Tibia I and II have 6 pairs of strong and very long spines (the longest about a third the length of tibia I), metatarsus I and II have 3 pairs of even longer spines (the longest about half the length of metatarsus I). Total length is 15 mm.

== Conservation ==
Anyphops amatolae is listed as Data Deficient. The status of the species remains obscure as the type specimen was collected in 1933. More sampling is needed to determine the species' range and collect males. Threats to the species are unknown.

== Taxonomy ==
The species was originally described by R. F. Lawrence in 1940 as Selenops amatolae from Hogsback. It was transferred to the genus Anyphops by Benoit in 1968 and later revised by Corronca in 2000.
