= Anyphops tugelanus =

Scientific classification
- Kingdom: Animalia
- Phylum: Arthropoda
- Subphylum: Chelicerata
- Class: Arachnida
- Order: Araneae
- Infraorder: Araneomorphae
- Family: Selenopidae
- Genus: Anyphops
- Species: A. tugelanus

Binomial name
- Anyphops tugelanus (Lawrence, 1942)

Species of spider

Anyphops tugelanus is a species of spider in the family Selenopidae. It is endemic to KwaZulu-Natal in South Africa.

== Distribution ==
Anyphops tugelanus is known only from the type locality of Middledrift, Tugela River in KwaZulu-Natal province of South Africa.

== Habitat and ecology ==
The species inhabits the Savanna biome at an altitude of 212 m above sea level. These are free-living cryptozoic nocturnal ground living spiders.

== Description ==
Anyphops tugelanus is known from only the female. The carapace has irregular indistinct spots and radiating stripes, with those at the lateral margins more distinct, and 3 short brown longitudinal bars behind the posterior median eyes.

The chelicerae are yellow with a darker spot at their anterior apices and one basally at their sides. The femora of legs have indistinct annulations, while tibiae and metatarsi have 2 distinct but not very dark bands. Ventral surfaces of legs are uniformly yellow. The tibiae I and II have 7 pairs of inferior spines, with the apical pair smaller than the others, and the metatarsi I and II have 3 pairs of inferior spines.

Total length is 13 mm.

== Conservation ==
Anyphops tugelanus is listed as Data Deficient for taxonomic reasons, as the species is known only from the type locality. More sampling is needed to determine the species' range.

== Taxonomy ==
The species was originally described by Reginald Frederick Lawrence in 1942 as Selenops tugelanus from Middledrift, Tugela River. It was later transferred to the genus Anyphops by Benoit in 1968. The species was last revised by Benoit in 1968.
