= Anyphops helenae =

Scientific classification
- Kingdom: Animalia
- Phylum: Arthropoda
- Subphylum: Chelicerata
- Class: Arachnida
- Order: Araneae
- Infraorder: Araneomorphae
- Family: Selenopidae
- Genus: Anyphops
- Species: A. helenae

Binomial name
- Anyphops helenae (Lawrence, 1940)

Species of spider

Anyphops helenae is a species of spider in the family Selenopidae. It is endemic to South Africa.

== Distribution ==
Anyphops helenae is endemic to the Western Cape province of South Africa. The species is known only from the type locality of Stompneus at St Helena Bay.

== Habitat and ecology ==
The species inhabits the Fynbos biome at an altitude of 109 m above sea level. These are free-living cryptozoic nocturnal spiders.

== Description ==
Known only from the female. The carapace is light reddish brown, ornamented with minute black specks and larger blackish spots, with a tuft of white hairs above and overhanging the anterior median eyes. The chelicerae are the same colour as the carapace.

The opisthosoma is brown above with some rather ill-defined symmetrical darker markings. The anterior legs have brown bands while the posterior ones are without bands. The anterior tibiae have 5 pairs of inferior spines.

Total length is 8 mm.

== Conservation ==
Anyphops helenae is listed as Data Deficient due to taxonomic reasons. The species has a very small range and more sampling is needed to collect males and determine the full extent of its distribution.

== Taxonomy ==
The species was originally described by Lawrence in 1940 as Selenops helenae. It was later transferred to the genus Anyphops by Benoit in 1968.
