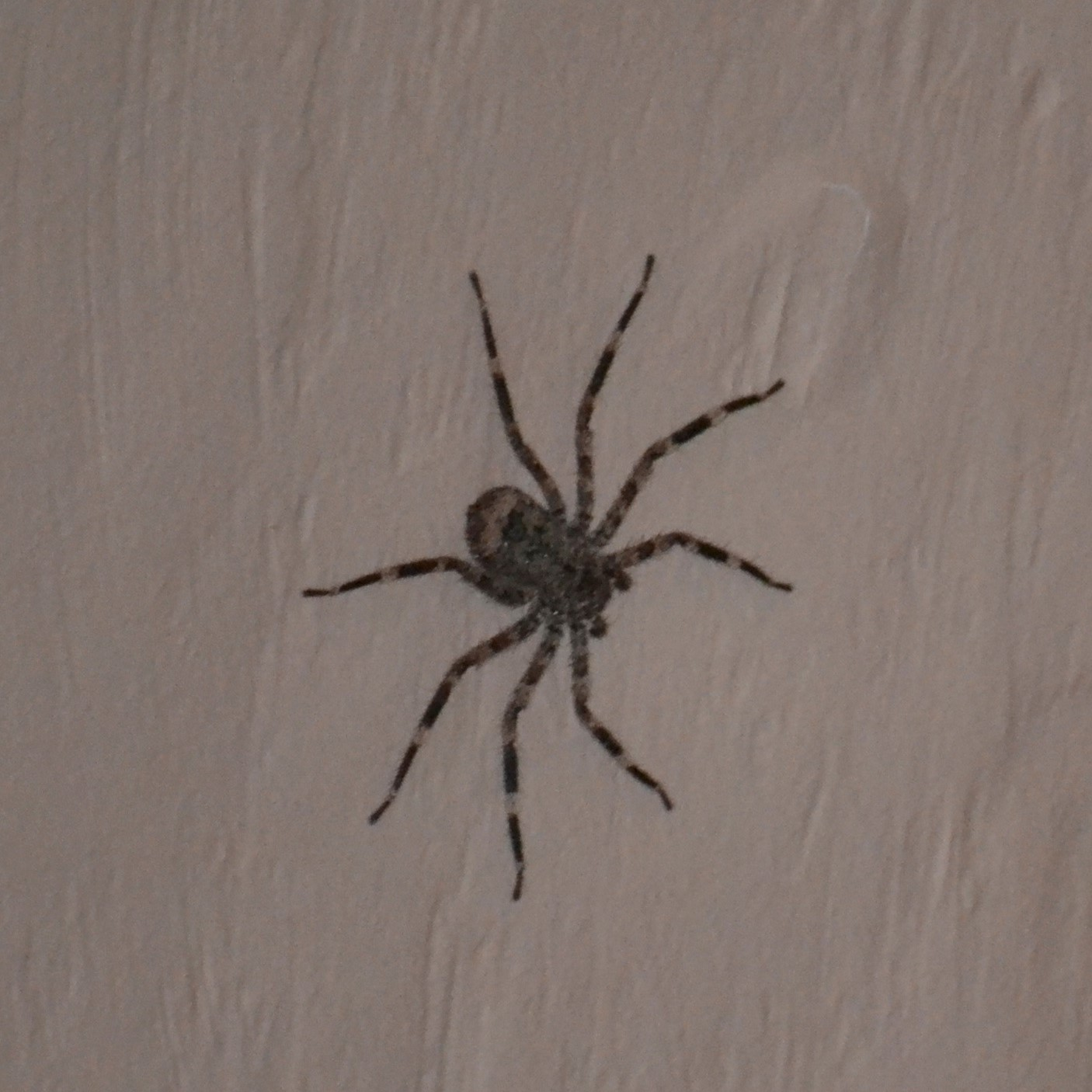
- Flattie in hotel room, Kruger National Park

Conservation status
- Least Concern (SANBI Red List)

Scientific classification
- Kingdom: Animalia
- Phylum: Arthropoda
- Subphylum: Chelicerata
- Class: Arachnida
- Order: Araneae
- Infraorder: Araneomorphae
- Family: Selenopidae
- Genus: Anyphops
- Species: A. rubicundus

Binomial name
- Anyphops rubicundus (Lawrence, 1940)

Synonyms
- Selenops rubicundus Lawrence, 1940

= Anyphops rubicundus =

Belfast Anyphops Flat Spider

Species of spider

Anyphops rubicundus is a species of spider in the family Selenopidae. It is endemic to South Africa and is commonly known as the Belfast Anyphops flat spider.

== Distribution ==
Anyphops rubicundus is found in South Africa across three provinces: Limpopo, Mpumalanga, and Western Cape. The species occurs at altitudes ranging from 285 to 1871 m above sea level. Notable locations include Kruger National Park in Limpopo, Belfast Witpoort, Brondal, and Nelspruit in Mpumalanga, and Swartberg Nature Reserve in the Western Cape.

== Habitat and ecology ==
The species inhabits Grassland and Savanna biomes. Anyphops rubicundus are free-living cryptozoic nocturnal ground-dwelling spiders. The species occurs abundantly in avocado and macadamia orchards.

== Description ==
Anyphops rubicundus is known only from the female. The carapace is yellow-brown, with the cephalic area not darker than the thoracic area. There is a marginal and submarginal row of ill-defined blackish spots. The thoracic striae continue onto the cephalic area as a fine blackish median line with a lateral branch on each side. The eye area is blackened.

The chelicerae have their inner halves blackened, with the remainder colored as in the carapace. The abdomen has a symmetrical pattern of black spots intermixed with red hairs. The femora of the legs have black irregular spots tending to merge into each other as stripes. The tibiae and metatarsi have weakly defined dark bands. Tibia I and II have 7, metatarsus I and II have 3 inferior pairs of spines.

The total length is 13 mm.

== Conservation ==
Anyphops rubicundus is listed as Least Concern due to its wide geographical range across three provinces. The species is protected in two protected areas: Kruger National Park and Swartberg Nature Reserve. Additional sampling is needed to collect males and determine the species' range. There are no known threats to the species.

== Taxonomy ==
Though initially classified by South African arachnologist Reginald Frederick Lawrence as part of the gens Selenops in 1940, it was later transferred to the genus Anyphops by Belgian arachnologist Pierre L.G. Benoit in 1968.
