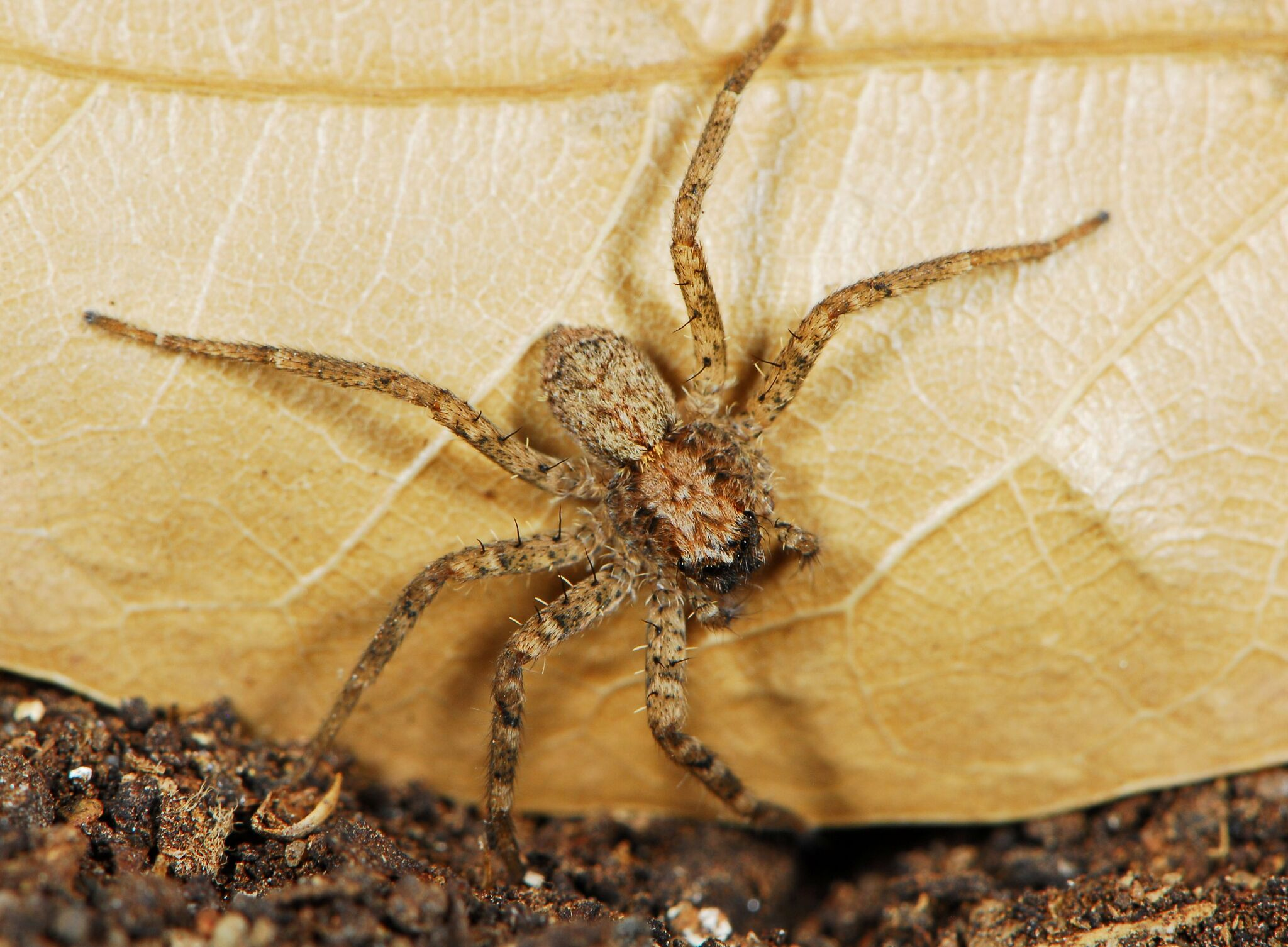
- Female

Scientific classification
- Kingdom: Animalia
- Phylum: Arthropoda
- Subphylum: Chelicerata
- Class: Arachnida
- Order: Araneae
- Infraorder: Araneomorphae
- Family: Selenopidae
- Genus: Anyphops
- Species: A. barbertonensis

Binomial name
- Anyphops barbertonensis (Lawrence, 1940)

= Anyphops barbertonensis =

Barberton Anyphops Flat Spider

Species of spider

Anyphops barbertonensis is a species of spider in the family Selenopidae. It occurs in southern Africa and is commonly known as the Barberton Anyphops flat spider.

== Distribution ==
Anyphops barbertonensis is found in South Africa and Eswatini.

In South Africa, the species occurs in the provinces Eastern Cape, Free State, Gauteng, KwaZulu-Natal, Limpopo, and Mpumalanga, at altitudes ranging from 1 to 1730 m above sea level.

== Habitat and ecology ==
The species inhabits the Fynbos, Indian Ocean Coastal Belt, Grassland, and Savanna biomes. These are free-living cryptozoic nocturnal ground dwellers that have been collected with pitfall traps and from under rocks.

== Description ==
The species is known only from females. The carapace is light brown with spots and dashes of brown, thoracic radiations faint, thoracic striae and sides of cephalic area defined by brown stripes, cephalic area bisected by a faint median stripe, which at half-way gives off a branch to each posterior median eye.

The chelicerae are light brown, with their inner apices darkened. The opisthosoma is light brown, finely speckled with some larger indistinct bars and spots. Tibia I and II have 6, metatarsus I and II have 3 pairs of inferior spines. Total length is 12.2 mm.

== Conservation ==
Anyphops barbertonensis is listed as Least Concern due to its wide geographical range. There are no known threats to the species. It is protected in several nature reserves including Mkhambathi Nature Reserve, Klipriviersberg Nature Reserve, Ndumo Game Reserve, Sungulwane Game Reserve, Blouberg Nature Reserve, and Lhuvhondo Nature Reserve.

== Taxonomy ==
The species was originally described by R. F. Lawrence in 1940 as Selenops barbertonensis from Barberton in Mpumalanga. It was transferred to the genus Anyphops by Benoit in 1968.
