= Anyphops hewitti =

Hewitt's Anyphops Flat Spider

Conservation status
- Least Concern (SANBI Red List)

Scientific classification
- Kingdom: Animalia
- Phylum: Arthropoda
- Subphylum: Chelicerata
- Class: Arachnida
- Order: Araneae
- Infraorder: Araneomorphae
- Family: Selenopidae
- Genus: Anyphops
- Species: A. hewitti

Binomial name
- Anyphops hewitti (Lawrence, 1940)

Species of spider

Anyphops hewitti is a species of spider in the family Selenopidae. It occurs in South Africa and Namibia and is commonly known as Hewitt's Anyphops flat spider.

== Distribution ==
Anyphops hewitti occurs in South Africa and Namibia. In South Africa, it is known from the Eastern Cape and Limpopo provinces, with localities including Grahamstown and the Wolkberg Wilderness Area.

== Habitat and ecology ==
The species inhabits Savanna and Thicket biomes at altitudes ranging from 556 to 1407 m above sea level. These are free-living cryptozoic nocturnal ground living spiders that are sometimes found under stones.

== Description ==
Known from both sexes. The carapace is light brown with a narrow black margin, with striae and some fine radiations from it black, and some spots close to the lateral margins black. There is a pair of short anteriorly diverging black bars behind the posterior median eyes. The chelicerae are light reddish brown.

The opisthosoma has two transverse black recurved markings in its posterior half, with the area above the spinnerets blackish. The legs have strong black bars, especially on the femur and base of the tibiae, which are much fainter in the posterior legs. The anterior tibiae have 5 pairs of inferior spines.

Total length is 8-9.5 mm.

== Conservation ==
Anyphops hewitti is listed as Least Concern due to its wide geographic range in southern Africa. The species is protected in the Wolkberg Wilderness Area, though more sampling is needed to determine the full extent of its range.

== Taxonomy ==
The species was originally described by Lawrence in 1940 as Selenops hewitti from Grahamstown. It was later transferred to the genus Anyphops by Benoit in 1968.
