= Anyphops dubiosus =

Scientific classification
- Kingdom: Animalia
- Phylum: Arthropoda
- Subphylum: Chelicerata
- Class: Arachnida
- Order: Araneae
- Infraorder: Araneomorphae
- Family: Selenopidae
- Genus: Anyphops
- Species: A. dubiosus

Binomial name
- Anyphops dubiosus (Lawrence, 1952)

Species of spider

Anyphops dubiosus is a species of spider in the family Selenopidae. It is endemic to South Africa.

== Distribution ==
Anyphops dubiosus is endemic to KwaZulu-Natal province in South Africa. The species is known only from two localities: Muller's Pass near Newcastle and Ngome State Forest.

== Habitat and ecology ==
The species inhabits Grassland and Forest biomes at altitudes ranging from 1044 to 1189 m above sea level. These are free-living cryptozoic nocturnal spiders that hide during the day and are active at night.

== Description ==
Known only from the female. The thoracic portion of the carapace is light brown with fine blackish lines radiating from the fovea, while the cephalic region is darker reddish-brown with the ocular area and clypeus blackish. The chelicerae are dark reddish-brown and the mouthparts brown, with the sternum ochre yellow.

The femora have small blackish spots above, patella with one basal band, and tibiae and metatarsi each with two darker bands that are stronger on the dorsal than ventral surface. The opisthosoma is light brown above, variegated with numerous minute spots and stripes, and uniformly ochre yellow below.

The anterior tibiae have 6 inferior spines, with leg II having 6-7 spines on one side, and metatarsi with 3 inferior pairs of long spines but no lateral spines. Total length is 17 mm.

== Conservation ==
Anyphops dubiosus is listed as Data Deficient due to taxonomic reasons. The species has a very small range with an extent of occurrence less than 500 km² and area of occupancy of 8 km². The status of the species remains unclear and more sampling is needed to collect males and determine the full range. The species receives some protection in the Ngome State Forest.

== Taxonomy ==
The species was originally described by Lawrence in 1952 as Selenops dubiosus from Muller's Pass near Newcastle. It was later transferred to the genus Anyphops by Benoit in 1968.
