= Anyphops barnardi =

Barnard's Anyphops Flat Spider

Conservation status
- Least Concern (SANBI Red List)

Scientific classification
- Kingdom: Animalia
- Phylum: Arthropoda
- Subphylum: Chelicerata
- Class: Arachnida
- Order: Araneae
- Infraorder: Araneomorphae
- Family: Selenopidae
- Genus: Anyphops
- Species: A. barnardi

Binomial name
- Anyphops barnardi (Lawrence, 1940)

Species of spider

Anyphops barnardi is a species of spider in the family Selenopidae. It occurs in southern Africa and is commonly known as Barnard's Anyphops flat spider.

== Distribution ==
Anyphops barnardi is found in Zimbabwe, Mozambique, and South Africa. In South Africa, the species occurs in the Northern Cape and Gauteng provinces, at altitudes ranging from 1069 to 1457 m above sea level.

== Habitat and ecology ==
The species inhabits the Savanna and Grassland biomes. These are free-living cryptozoic nocturnal ground dwellers that have been collected with pitfall traps and from under rocks.

== Description ==
The species is known only from females. The carapace is fairly dark reddish brown, cephalic portion a little darker than thoracic portion, ocular area black, radiations from the thoracic stria not strongly marked, with a number of submarginal spots subjoined to form a wavy band. The chelicerae are a little darker than the cephalic area.

The opisthosoma above is blackish brown, with some ill-defined symmetrical markings. The legs have well-defined and fairly strong bands. Tibia I and II have 5, metatarsus I and II have 3 pairs of inferior spines. Total length is 30.3 mm.

== Conservation ==
Anyphops barnardi is listed as Least Concern due to its wide geographical range. There are no known threats to the species. It is protected in Rooipoort Nature Reserve and Rietvleidam Nature Reserve. More sampling is needed to collect males.

== Taxonomy ==
The species was originally described by R. F. Lawrence in 1940 as Selenops barnardi from Pokwani, Zimbabwe. It was transferred to the genus Anyphops by Benoit in 1968.
