= Anyphops phallus =

Scientific classification
- Kingdom: Animalia
- Phylum: Arthropoda
- Subphylum: Chelicerata
- Class: Arachnida
- Order: Araneae
- Infraorder: Araneomorphae
- Family: Selenopidae
- Genus: Anyphops
- Species: A. phallus

Binomial name
- Anyphops phallus (Lawrence, 1952)

Synonyms
- Selenops phallus Lawrence, 1952

Species of spider

Anyphops phallus is a species of spider in the family Selenopidae. It is endemic to South Africa.

== Distribution ==
Anyphops phallus is found only in KwaZulu-Natal, South Africa. The species is known only from Otto's Bluff, Pietermaritzburg, at an altitude of 1668 m above sea level.

== Habitat and ecology ==
The species inhabits the Grassland biome. Anyphops phallus are free-living cryptozoic nocturnal ground-dwelling spiders.

== Description ==
Anyphops phallus is known from both sexes. The carapace is reddish-brown, with the thoracic portion having two submarginal crenulated darker bands, the inner wider than the outer one. The cephalic portion has a V-shaped dark marking behind the eyes.

The chelicerae are reddish-brown with ill-defined darker markings. The sternum, mouthparts and undersides of legs are ochre yellow. The femora above have two crenulated darker bands, patellae have one, tibiae have two dark bands.

The abdomen above is brown with some symmetrical lighter patches, below ochre yellow. The anterior tibiae have 5 pairs of inferior spines, metatarsi have 3 inferior pairs, with no lateral spines. The total length is 6 mm.

== Conservation ==
Anyphops phallus is listed as Data Deficient due to its very restricted range and uncertain taxonomic status. The species is known only from the type locality. Additional sampling is needed to determine the species' range. Threats to the species are unknown.

== Taxonomy ==
The species was originally described by Reginald Frederick Lawrence in 1952 as Selenops phallus from Otto's Bluff, Pietermaritzburg. It was transferred to the genus Anyphops by Benoit in 1968.
