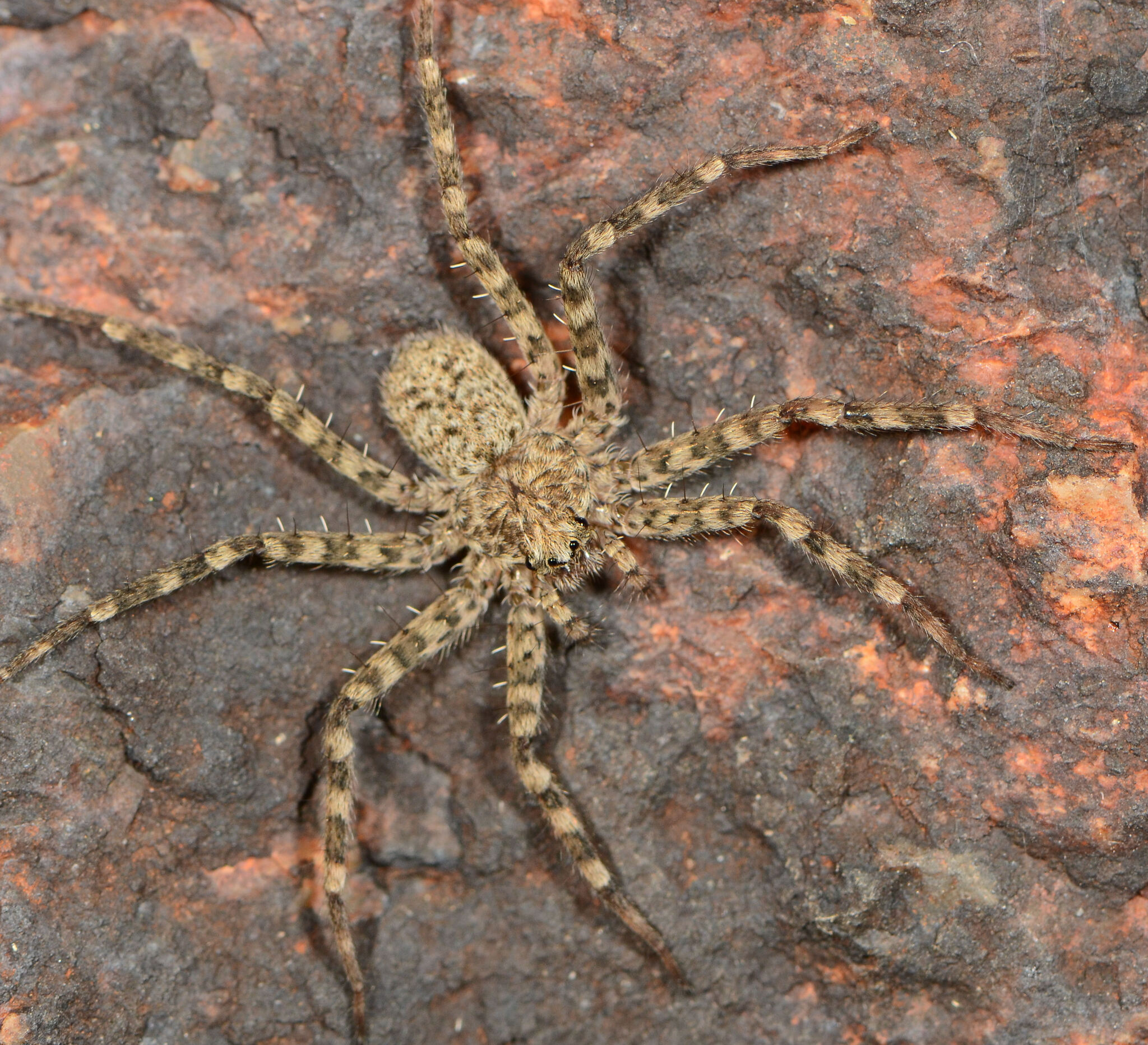
- Female
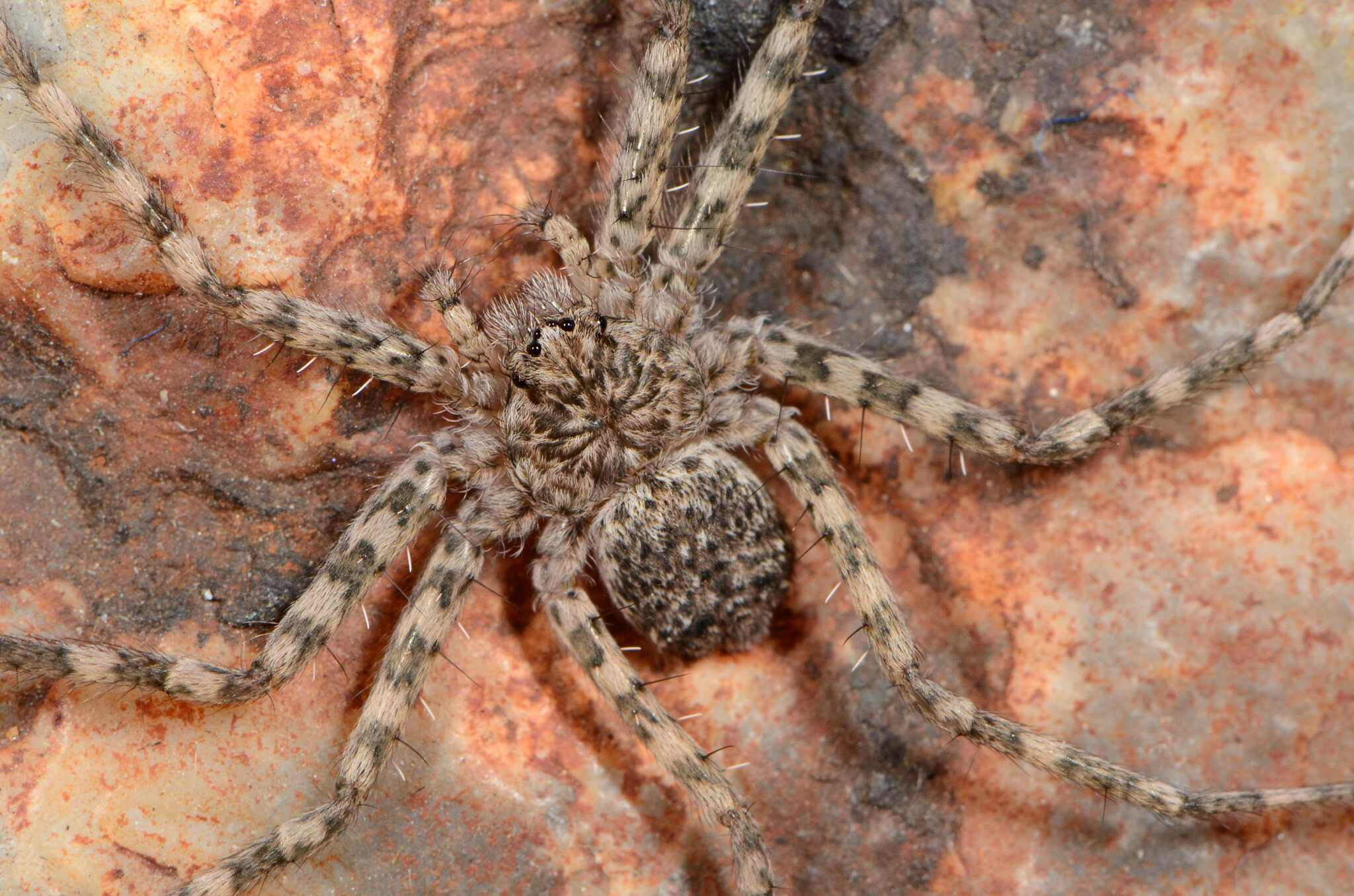
- Female

Scientific classification
- Kingdom: Animalia
- Phylum: Arthropoda
- Subphylum: Chelicerata
- Class: Arachnida
- Order: Araneae
- Infraorder: Araneomorphae
- Family: Selenopidae
- Genus: Anyphops
- Species: A. broomi

Binomial name
- Anyphops broomi (Pocock, 1900)

= Anyphops broomi =

Garies Anyphops Flat Spider

Species of spider

Anyphops broomi is a species of spider in the family Selenopidae. It is endemic to South Africa and is commonly known as the Garies anyphops flat spider.

== Distribution ==
Anyphops broomi is found in South Africa. The species occurs in the Free State, Northern Cape, and Western Cape provinces, at altitudes ranging from 27 to 1645 m above sea level.

== Habitat and ecology ==
Anyphops broomi inhabits Grassland, Desert, and Succulent Karoo biomes. These are free-living cryptozoic nocturnal ground dwellers.

== Description ==
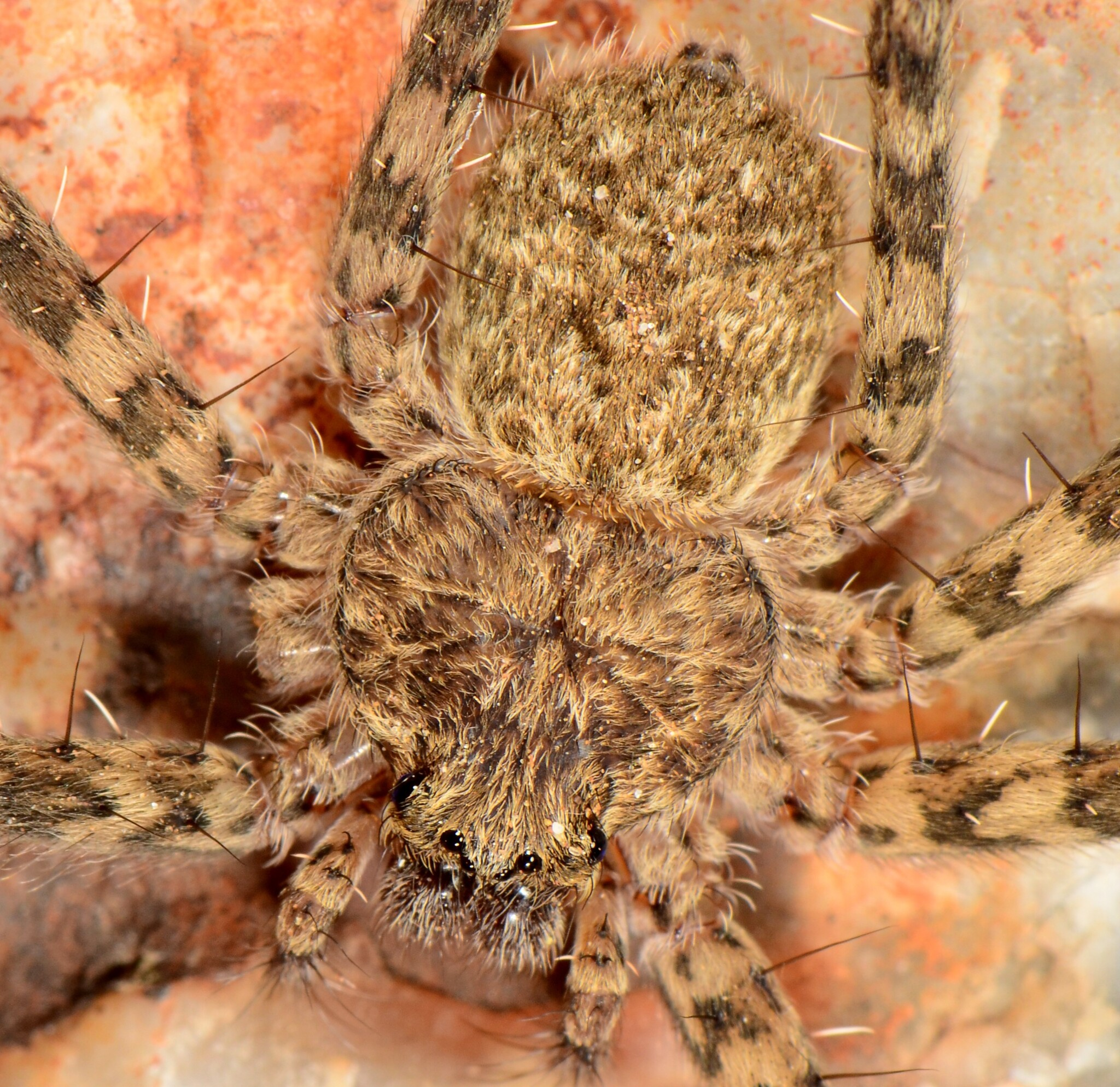
female

The species is known from both sexes. The carapace is yellow brown, thoracic striae black and strongly defined, continued on to the cephalic portion as a very fine black line, with radiations from thoracic striae long, fine, but distinct.

The opisthosoma is light brown, with some short longitudinal black bars and spots, and a wavy transverse blackish band above the spinners. The legs have dark bands, those on the femora poorly defined, especially the posterior ones, and those of the tibia well defined.

The colour of males is much lighter than in females. Anterior tibiae have 5, anterior metatarsi have 3 pairs of inferior spines. Total length is 14-15 mm in females and 13-14 mm in males.

== Conservation ==
Anyphops broomi is listed as Least Concern due to the wide geographical range. There are no known threats to the species. It is protected in Richtersveld National Park.

== Taxonomy ==
The species was originally described by Reginald Innes Pocock in 1900 as Selenops broomi from Garies in the Northern Cape. It was transferred to the genus Anyphops by Benoit in 1968.
