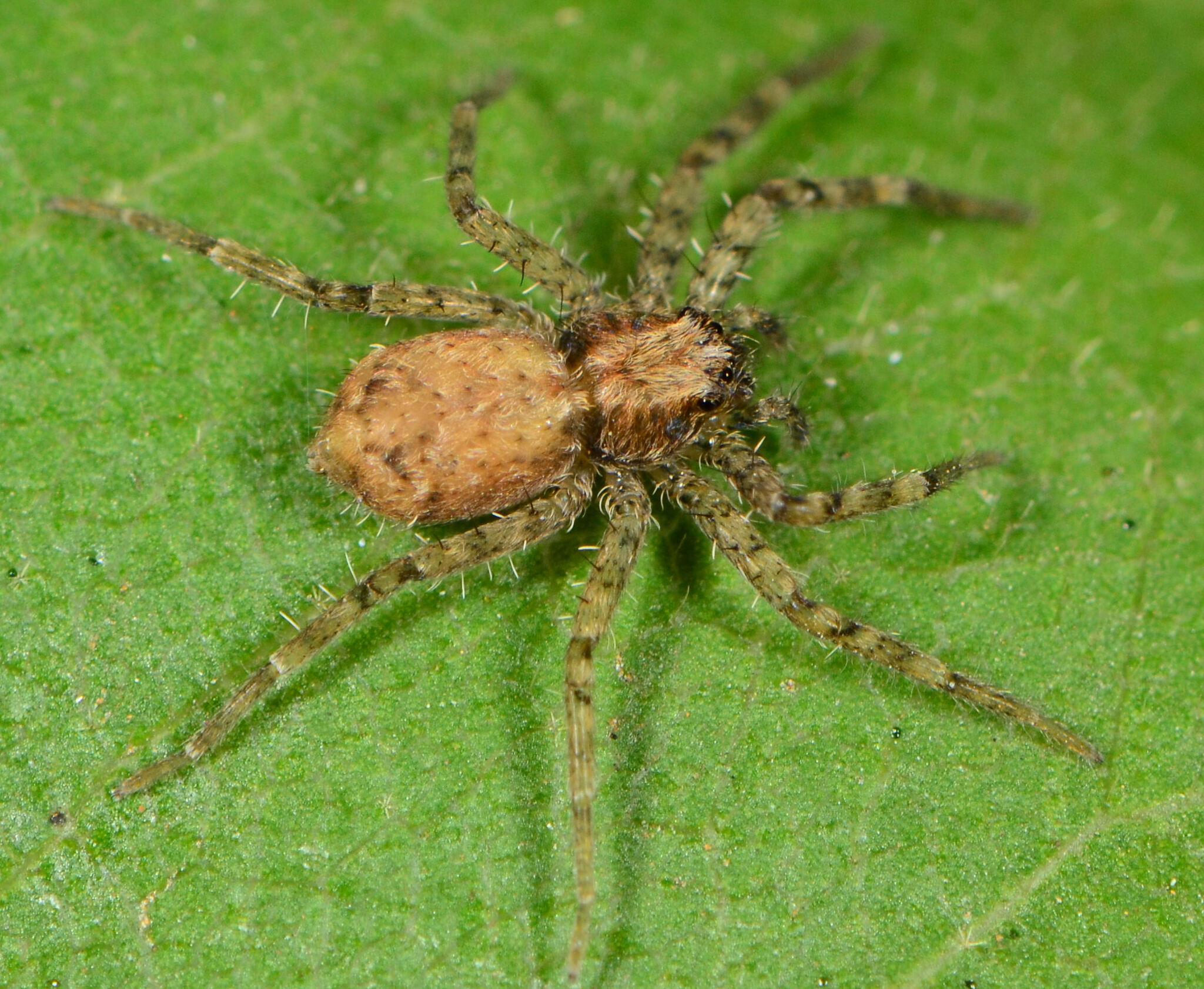
- Female
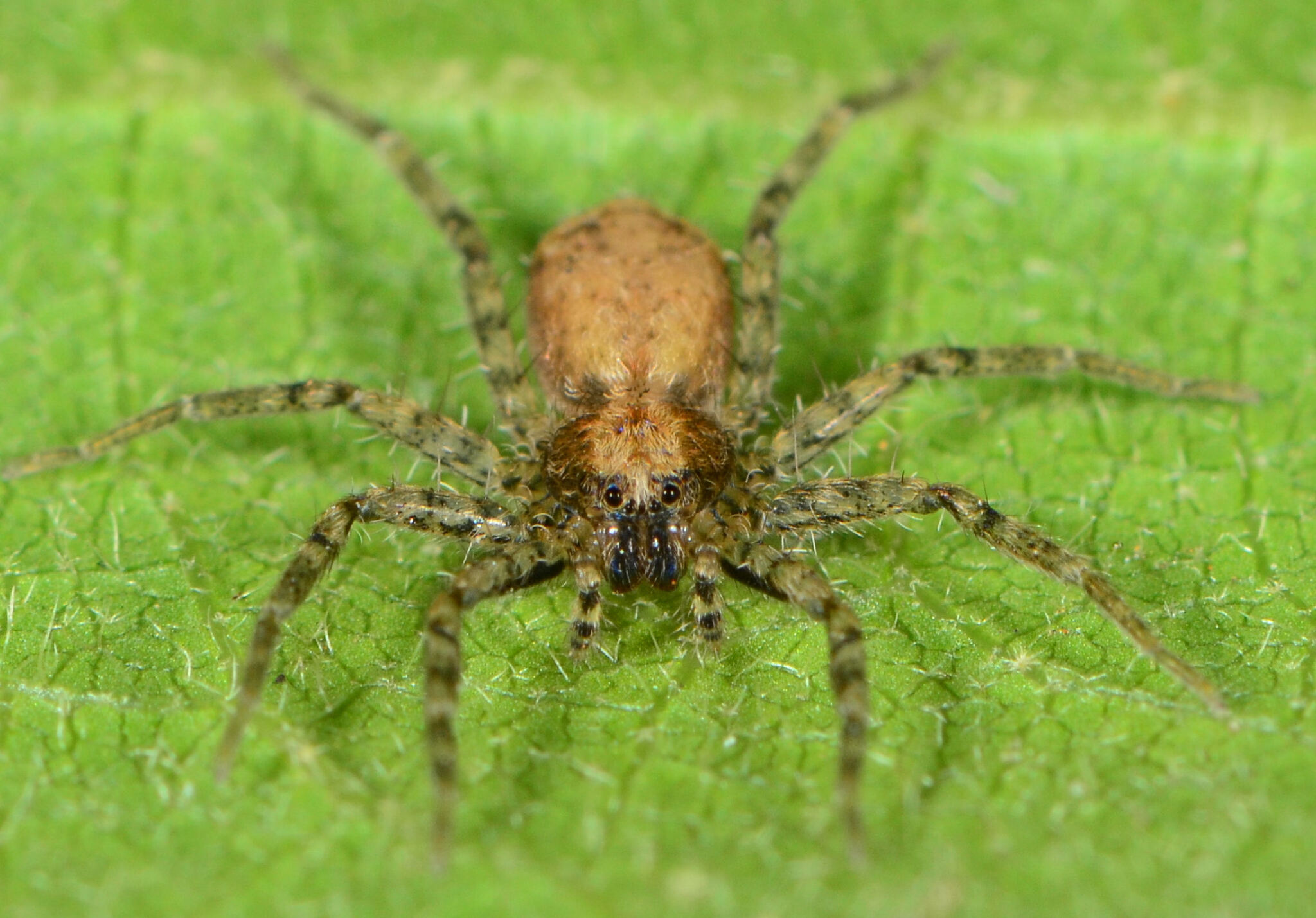
- Female

Scientific classification
- Kingdom: Animalia
- Phylum: Arthropoda
- Subphylum: Chelicerata
- Class: Arachnida
- Order: Araneae
- Infraorder: Araneomorphae
- Family: Selenopidae
- Genus: Anyphops
- Species: A. lucia

Binomial name
- Anyphops lucia Corronca, 2005

= Anyphops lucia =

St Lucia Anyphops Flat Spider

Species of spider

Anyphops lucia is a species of spider in the family Selenopidae. It is endemic to South Africa and is commonly known as the St Lucia Anyphops flat spider.

== Distribution ==
Anyphops lucia is endemic to the South African KwaZulu-Natal Province. It has been recorded from iSimangaliso Wetland Park at St. Lucia (Fanie's Camp) and Umhlanga at an altitude of 5 m above sea level.

== Habitat and ecology ==
The species inhabits the Indian Ocean Coastal Belt biome and is a free-living cryptozoic nocturnal ground-dwelling spider.

== Description ==
Only the female is known. The carapace is red brown with lateral dark grey irregular markings reaching to the lateral edges. The chelicerae are red-brown with a wide longitudinal inner dark brown band.

The legs are orange-brown, mottled dark grey, with patellae II and IV having a dark basal band and femur IV having a prolateral and longitudinal pale line limited by grey parallel lines. Metatarsus IV has a dark terminal spot.

The dorsum of the abdomen is whitish, dotted by grey irregular spots, with lateral and posterior portions darker. The venter is pale yellow-grey. The anterior tibiae have 6 pairs of inferior spines. Total length is 7.73 mm.

== Conservation ==
Anyphops lucia is listed as Data Deficient due to taxonomic reasons. The species has a very small known range and more sampling is needed to collect males and determine the species' full range. It receives some protection within iSimangaliso Wetland Park.

== Etymology ==
The species is named after St. Lucia, the type locality where it was first collected.
