= Anyphops schoenlandi =

Jansenville Anyphops Flat Spider

Conservation status
- Least Concern (SANBI Red List)

Scientific classification
- Kingdom: Animalia
- Phylum: Arthropoda
- Subphylum: Chelicerata
- Class: Arachnida
- Order: Araneae
- Infraorder: Araneomorphae
- Family: Selenopidae
- Genus: Anyphops
- Species: A. schoenlandi

Binomial name
- Anyphops schoenlandi (Pocock, 1902)

Synonyms
- Selenops schönlandi Pocock, 1902; Selenops schoenlandi Lawrence, 1940

Species of spider

Anyphops schoenlandi is a species of spider in the family Selenopidae. It is endemic to the Eastern Cape, South Africa and is commonly known as the Jansenville Anyphops flat spider.

== Distribution ==
Anyphops schoenlandi is found in the Eastern Cape, South Africa. The species occurs at altitudes ranging from 39 to 778 m above sea level. Notable locations include Addo Elephant National Park, Graaff-Reinet, Jansenville, and Pearston.

== Habitat and ecology ==
The species inhabits Nama Karoo and Thicket biomes. Anyphops schoenlandi are free-living cryptozoic nocturnal ground-dwelling spiders.

== Description ==
Anyphops schoenlandi is known only from the female. The carapace is reddish brown with a narrow black margin. The cephalic portion is bisected by a fine black line, with a branch from the middle of this line running to the base of each posterior median eye.

The abdomen above is thickly covered with blackish-brown symmetrical blotches and markings. The sides are more dotted, with a broad transverse bow-shaped light marking above the spinnerets, separated from them by a black wavy transverse bar. The legs have strong black bands. The anterior tibiae have 5, anterior metatarsi have 3 pairs of inferior spines. The total length is 12.8 mm.

== Conservation ==
Anyphops schoenlandi is listed as Least Concern. Much natural habitat remains within its range and it is likely to be undersampled. The species is protected in Addo Elephant National Park. Additional sampling is needed to collect males and determine the species' range. Threats to the species are unknown.

== Etymology ==
The species is named after Selmar Schönland, a German-born South African botanist who worked at the Albany Museum in Grahamstown.

== Taxonomy ==
The species was originally described by Reginald Innes Pocock in 1902 as Selenops schönlandi from Jansenville in the Eastern Cape. Lawrence redescribed it in 1940 as Selenops schoenlandi. It was transferred to the genus Anyphops by Benoit in 1968.
