= Anyphops lochiel =

Scientific classification
- Kingdom: Animalia
- Phylum: Arthropoda
- Subphylum: Chelicerata
- Class: Arachnida
- Order: Araneae
- Infraorder: Araneomorphae
- Family: Selenopidae
- Genus: Anyphops
- Species: A. lochiel

Binomial name
- Anyphops lochiel Corronca, 2000

Species of spider

Anyphops lochiel is a species of spider in the family Selenopidae. It is endemic to South Africa.

== Distribution ==
Anyphops lochiel occurs in two South African provinces, Limpopo and Mpumalanga. It has been recorded from Blouberg Nature Reserve in Limpopo and Lochiel in Mpumalanga at altitudes ranging from 894 to 1,599 m above sea level.

== Habitat and ecology ==
The species inhabits the Savanna biome and is a free-living cryptozoic nocturnal ground-dwelling spider.

== Description ==
Only the female is known. The carapace is pale orange brown and the abdomen is yellowish with grey spots. The anterior tibiae have 6 pairs of inferior spines. Total length is 10.3 mm.

== Conservation ==
Anyphops lochiel is listed as Data Deficient due to taxonomic reasons. The species is known from a small area and more sampling is needed to collect males and determine the species' full range. It is protected within Blouberg Nature Reserve.

== Etymology ==
The species is named after Lochiel in Mpumalanga, the type locality where it was first collected.
