= Anyphops spenceri =

Spencer's Anyphops Flat Spider

Conservation status
- Least Concern (SANBI Red List)

Scientific classification
- Kingdom: Animalia
- Phylum: Arthropoda
- Subphylum: Chelicerata
- Class: Arachnida
- Order: Araneae
- Infraorder: Araneomorphae
- Family: Selenopidae
- Genus: Anyphops
- Species: A. spenceri

Binomial name
- Anyphops spenceri (Pocock, 1896)

Species of spider

Anyphops spenceri is a species of spider in the family Selenopidae. It is endemic to South Africa and is commonly known as Spencer's Anyphops flat spider.

== Distribution ==
Anyphops spenceri is found across three South African provinces: Eastern Cape, KwaZulu-Natal, and Limpopo. Notable locations include Addo Elephant National Park, Baviaanskloof Nature Reserve, Durban, Grahamstown, and Lhuvhondo Nature Reserve.

== Habitat and ecology ==
The species inhabits multiple biomes including Grassland, Savanna, and Thicket biomes at altitudes ranging from 17 to 1,412 m above sea level. These are free-living cryptozoic nocturnal ground living spiders.

== Description ==
Anyphops spenceri is known from only the female. The carapace is yellowish brown, partially clothed with white hairs, which contrasting with the yellow of the integument gives it a mottled appearance. A fine dark line occurs on lateral edges, and the region of the eyes is deeply pigmented with black.

The abdomen is thickly mottled above with fine brown and white spots and clothed with whitish hairs below. Legs are faintly variegated with stripes. The tibiae of first and second legs have 7 pairs of inferior spines, and protarsi have 3 pairs. Total length is 11 mm.

== Conservation ==
Anyphops spenceri is listed as Least Concern by the South African National Biodiversity Institute due to its wide geographical range. The species is protected in Baviaanskloof Nature Reserve, Addo Elephant National Park, and Lhuvhondo Nature Reserve.

== Taxonomy ==
The species was originally described by Reginald Innes Pocock in 1896 as Selenops spenceri from Durban in KwaZulu-Natal. It was later transferred to the genus Anyphops by Benoit in 1968.
