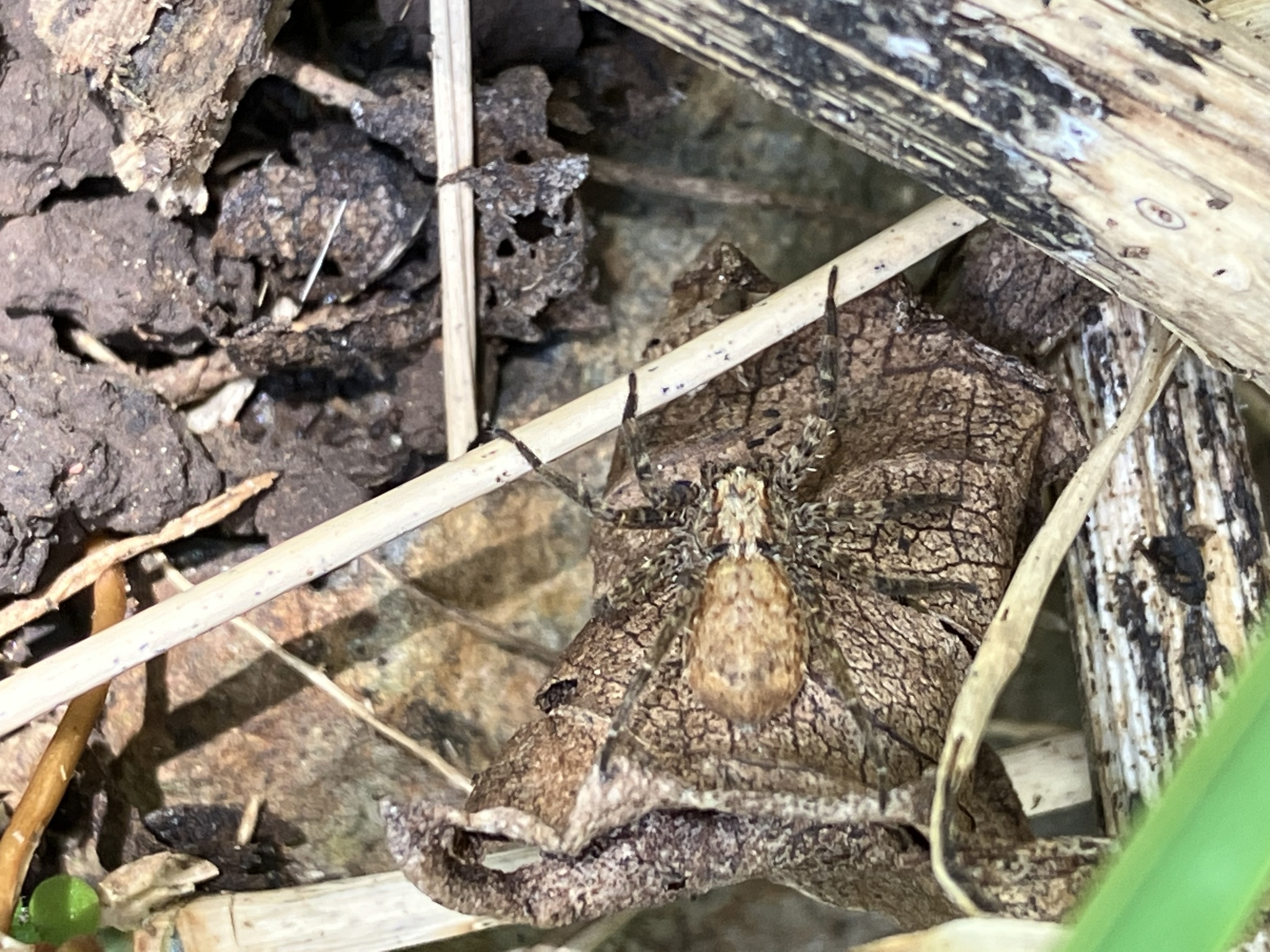
- A. stauntoni in St. Helena

Scientific classification
- Kingdom: Animalia
- Phylum: Arthropoda
- Subphylum: Chelicerata
- Class: Arachnida
- Order: Araneae
- Infraorder: Araneomorphae
- Family: Selenopidae
- Genus: Anyphops
- Species: A. stauntoni

Binomial name
- Anyphops stauntoni (Pocock, 1902)

Synonyms
- Selenops elusus Lawrence, 1937; Selenops nemorensis Kauri, 1950

= Anyphops stauntoni =

Stauntoni's Anyphops Flat Spider

Species of spider

Anyphops stauntoni is a species of spider in the family Selenopidae. It is commonly known as Stauntoni's Anyphops flat spider.

== Distribution ==
Anyphops stauntoni is distributed across St. Helena and South Africa.

In South Africa, it is found in the provinces Eastern Cape, Gauteng, KwaZulu-Natal, and North West. The species has been recorded from numerous locations including protected areas such as Kosi Bay Nature Reserve, Vernon Crookes Nature Reserve, and uMkhuze Game Reserve.

== Habitat and ecology ==
The species inhabits a variety of biomes including Forest, Grassland, Savanna, and Thicket biomes at altitudes ranging from 4 to 1,588 m above sea level. These are free-living nocturnal ground living spiders that have been sampled from pitfall traps in both open and dense indigenous forest.

== Description ==
Anyphops stauntoni is known from both sexes. The carapace has a broad, almost parallel-sided light band in the middle, constricted near the posterior border, with sides having a blackish band a little narrower than the median band. The chelicerae are blackish, while the sternum and coxae are light, and mouthparts are light brown.

The abdomen lacks pattern above, with the posterior half darker than the anterior and a broken black band at its anterior apex. Sides are blackish, especially posteriorly, while the undersurface is light. Legs are variegated with distinct black bands. The tibiae I and II have 6 pairs of inferior spines, and metatarsi have 3 pairs. Total length is 8.5 mm.

== Conservation ==
Anyphops stauntoni is listed as Least Concern by the South African National Biodiversity Institute due to its wide geographical range. The species is protected in Kosi Bay Nature Reserve, Vernon Crookes Nature Reserve, uMkhuze Game Reserve, and several State Forest areas.

== Taxonomy ==
The species was originally described by Reginald Innes Pocock in 1902 as Selenops stauntoni from Durban in KwaZulu-Natal. Lawrence (1938) synonymized Selenops elusus Lawrence, 1937 with this species, and Benoit (1977) later synonymized Selenops nemorensis Kauri, 1950. The species was transferred to the genus Anyphops by Benoit in 1968.
