= Anyphops silvicolellus =

Krugerpark Anyphops Flat Spider

Conservation status
- Least Concern (SANBI Red List)

Scientific classification
- Kingdom: Animalia
- Phylum: Arthropoda
- Subphylum: Chelicerata
- Class: Arachnida
- Order: Araneae
- Infraorder: Araneomorphae
- Family: Selenopidae
- Genus: Anyphops
- Species: A. silvicolellus

Binomial name
- Anyphops silvicolellus (Strand, 1913)

Species of spider

Anyphops silvicolellus is a species of spider in the family Selenopidae. It is commonly known as the Krugerpark Anyphops flat spider.

== Distribution ==
Anyphops silvicolellus is distributed across four African countries: Democratic Republic of the Congo, Rwanda, Tanzania, and South Africa. In South Africa, the species is found only in Limpopo province, where it has been recorded from Kruger National Park and Lekgalameetse Nature Reserve.

== Habitat and ecology ==
The species inhabits the Savanna biome at altitudes ranging from 418 to 1,245 m above sea level. These are free-living cryptozoic nocturnal ground living spiders that have been sampled from trees.

== Description ==
Anyphops silvicolellus is known from both sexes. The tibiae I and II have seven pairs of inferior spines. Females have a large, rectangular genital plate with two incisions at the upper edge. Total length ranges from 8-12 mm.

== Conservation ==
Anyphops silvicolellus is listed as Least Concern by the South African National Biodiversity Institute due to its wide geographical range across Africa. The species is protected in two protected areas: Lekgalameetse Nature Reserve and Kruger National Park.

== Taxonomy ==
The species was originally described by Embrik Strand in 1913 as Selenops silvicolella from Rwanda. It was later transferred to the genus Anyphops by Benoit in 1968.
