= Anyphops atomarius =

Eastern Cape Anyphops Flat Spider

Conservation status
- Least Concern (SANBI Red List)

Scientific classification
- Kingdom: Animalia
- Phylum: Arthropoda
- Subphylum: Chelicerata
- Class: Arachnida
- Order: Araneae
- Infraorder: Araneomorphae
- Family: Selenopidae
- Genus: Anyphops
- Species: A. atomarius

Binomial name
- Anyphops atomarius (Simon, 1887)

Synonyms
- Selenops subradiatus Strand, 1906

Species of spider

Anyphops atomarius is a species of spider in the family Selenopidae. It is endemic to South Africa and is commonly known as the Eastern Cape Anyphops flat spider. This species serves as the type species for the genus Anyphops.

== Distribution ==
Anyphops atomarius is found in South Africa. The species occurs in the Eastern Cape and Western Cape provinces, including localities such as Grahamstown, Port Elizabeth, Steytlerville, Alicedale, and Cape Town, at altitudes ranging from 7 to 552 m above sea level.

== Habitat and ecology ==
The species inhabits the Fynbos and Thicket biomes. These are free-living cryptozoic nocturnal ground dwellers.

== Description ==
The species is known from both sexes. The legs have distinct bands. Anterior tibiae have 5 inferior pairs of spines, tibia II has 1 posterior lateral spine in addition, and anterior metatarsi have 3 inferior pairs of spines. Total length is 8 mm.

== Conservation ==
Anyphops atomarius is listed as Least Concern due to its wide geographic range. There are no known threats to the species.

== Taxonomy ==
The species was originally described by Eugène Simon in 1887 as Selenops atomarius from Port Elizabeth. It was transferred to the genus Anyphops by Benoit in 1968 and serves as the type species for the genus. Selenops subradiatus Strand, 1906 was later synonymized with this species by Roewer in 1955.
