= Reginald Frederick Lawrence =

- Born: 6 March 1897; George, Western Cape
- Died: 9 October 1987 (aged 90); Pietermaritzburg
- Education: South African College
- Spouse: Ella Thompson Pratt Yule
- Scientific career
- Fields: Arachnology, Myriapodology
- Workplaces: Natal Museum

Reginald Frederick Lawrence FRSSAf (6 March 1897 in George, Western Cape – 9 October 1987 in Pietermaritzburg) was a South African arachnologist and myriapodologist at the South African Museum in Cape Town from 1922 until 1935, director of the Natal Museum in Pietermaritzburg from 1935 until 1948 and a researcher and staff member of the same museum until 1986.

== Career ==
Lawrence was educated at St. Andrew's College, Grahamstown from 1908 to 1913. He studied at the South African College (now University of Cape Town), where he graduated with his B.Sc. in 1922. His studies had been interrupted by World War I, when he served with the infantry in France.

He joined the staff of the South African Museum in 1922 as assistant in charge of Arachnida. While in the staff of the museum, he made several collecting expeditions in the southern part of the continent. His collection of arachnids formed the basis for the research upon which he received his Ph.D. from the University of Cape Town in 1928.

He was appointed director of the Natal Museum in Pietermaritzburg in 1935, a position he gave up in 1948 in order to spend more time on research. He collected in forests from the southern Cape to the Limpopo River, and from the coast of the Indian Ocean in the east, to Drakensberg in the west. He also collected in Madagascar, Mauritius, Mozambique, South-West Africa, and Zimbabwe (then southern Rhodesia).

== Personal life ==
Lawrence married Ella Thompson Pratt Yule.

== Legacy ==
Lawrence is commemorated in the scientific names of two species of southern African lizards, Lygodactylus lawrencei and Namazonurus lawrenci.

== Publications ==
The following list is from Museu Nacional Rio de Janeiro.

- Lawrence, R.F. (1931). The Harvest-Spiders (Opiliones) of South Africa. Annals of the South African Museum, Cape Town, 29(2), 341–508. (Pdf)
- Lawrence, R.F. (1933). The Harvest-Spiders (Opiliones) of Natal. Annals of the Natal Museum, Pietermaritzburg, 7(2), 211–241, 9 figs. (Pdf)
- Lawrence, R.F. (1934). (New South African Opiliones. Annals of the South African Museum, Cape Town, 30(4), 549–586, 19 figs. (Pdf)
- Lawrence, R.F. (1937a). A collection of Arachnida from Zululand. Annals of the Natal Museum, Pietermaritzburg, 8(2), 211–273, 30 figs.
- Lawrence, R.F. (1937b). A stridulating organ in harvest-spiders. Annals and Magazine of Natural History, (10) 20, 364–369. (Pdf)
- Lawrence, R.F. (1937c). New harvest spiders from Natal and Zululand. Annals of the Natal Museum, Pietermaritzburg, 8(2), 127–153, 11 fig.
- Lawrence, R.F. (1937d). The external sexual characteristics of South African harvest-spiders. Transactions of the Royal Society of South Africa, Cape Town, 24(4), 331–337, 2 pl. (Pdf)
- Lawrence, R.F. (1938a) Harvest-spiders of Natal and Zululand. Annals of the Natal Museum, Pietermaritzburg, 8(3), 345–371. [Issued April, 1938].
- Lawrence, R.F. (1938b). The odoriferous glands of some South African harvest-spiders. Transactions of the Royal Society of South Africa, Cape Town, 25(4), 333–342.
- Lawrence, R.F. (1939). A contribution to the Opilionid fauna of Natal and Zululand. Annals of the Natal Museum, Pietermaritzburg, 9(2), 225–243.
- Lawrence, R.F. (1947a). A collection of Arachnida made by Dr. I. Trägårdh in Natal and Zululand (1904–1905). Göteborgs Kungl. Vetenskaps- och Vitterhets- Samhälles Handlingar, (6 B) 5(9), 1–41. (Pdf)
- Lawrence, R.F. (1947b). Opiliones from the Ivory Coast of West Africa collected by R. Paulian and C. Delamare-Deboutteville. Revue française d'entomologie, Paris, 14(1), 34–46.
- Lawrence, R.F. (1949). A collection of Opiliones and Scorpions from North-East Angola made by Dr. A. de Barros Machado in 1948. Publicações culturais Companhia de Diamantes de Angola (Diamang), Serviços Culturais, Dundo-Luanda-Angola-Lisboa, 1949, 1–20.
- Lawrence, R.F. (1951). A further collection of opiliones from Angola made by Dr. A. de Barros Machado in 1948–1949. Publicações culturais Companhia de Diamantes de Angola (Diamang), Serviços Culturais, Dundo-Luanda-Angola-Lisboa, 13, 29–44, 4 figs.
- Lawrence, R.F. (1952). A collection of cavernicolous and termitophilous Arachnida from the Belgian Congo. Revue de zoologie et de botanique africaines, 46, 1–17, 9 figs.
- Lawrence, R.F. (1953). The Biology of the Cryptic Fauna of Forests.
- Lawrence, R.F. (1957a). A third collection of opiliones from Angola. Publicações culturais Companhia de Diamantes de Angola (Diamang), Serviços Culturais, Dundo-Luanda-Angola-Lisboa, 34, 51–66, 3 figs.
- Lawrence, R.F. (1957b). The Opiliones collected by Dr. A. de Barros Machado in the Belgian Congo during 1953 and 1955. Revue de zoologie et de botanique africaines, 56(1–2), 151–166, 4 figs.
- Lawrence, R.F. (1958). A collection of cavernicolous Arachnida from French Equatorial Africa. Revue suisse de Zoologie, 65(4), 857–866, 3 figs. (Pdf)
- Lawrence, R.F. (1959). Arachnides-Opilions. Faune de Madagascar, Publications de L’Institut de Recherche Scientifique Tananarive – Tsimbazaza, 9, 1–121, 35 figs. (Pdf)
- Lawrence, R.F. (1962a). The significance of cave-living animals in the study of zoogeography. Annals of the Cape Provincial Museums, 2, 206–211. (Pdf)
- Lawrence, R.F. (1962b). LXXIV.- Opiliones. In: Resultats scientifiques des missions zoologiques de l`IRSAC en Afrique orientale - (P. Basilewsky et N. Leleup, 1957). Annales Musée Royal de l'Afrique Centrale, (Sciences zoologiques) 110, 9–89, figs. 1–136. (Pdf)
- Lawrence, R.F. (1963). The Opiliones of the Transvaal. Annals of the Transvaal Museum, Pretoria, 24, 275–304. (Pdf)
- Lawrence, R.F. (1964). A small collection of Opiliones from the Ivory Coast of West Africa. Bulletin du Museum National d'histoire naturelle, Paris, (2) 36, 797–811, 19 figs.
- Lawrence, R.F. (1984). The Centipedes and Millipedes of Southern Africa: a Guide.
