= List of Selenopidae species =

This page lists all described species of the spider family Selenopidae accepted by the World Spider Catalog as of January 2021:

== Amamanganops ==
Amamanganops

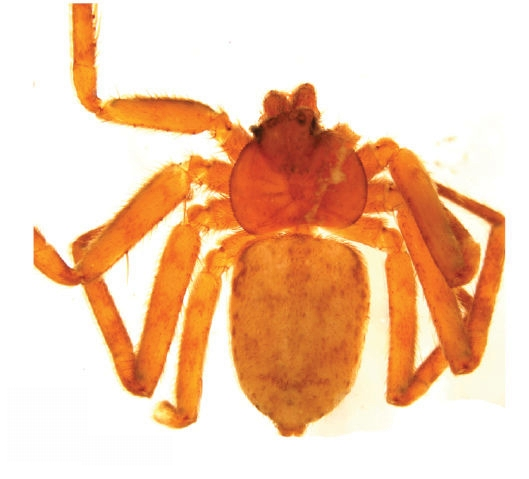
Amamanganops baginawa

Amamanganops Crews & Harvey, 2011

- A. baginawa Crews & Harvey, 2011 (type) — Philippines

== Anyphops ==
Anyphops

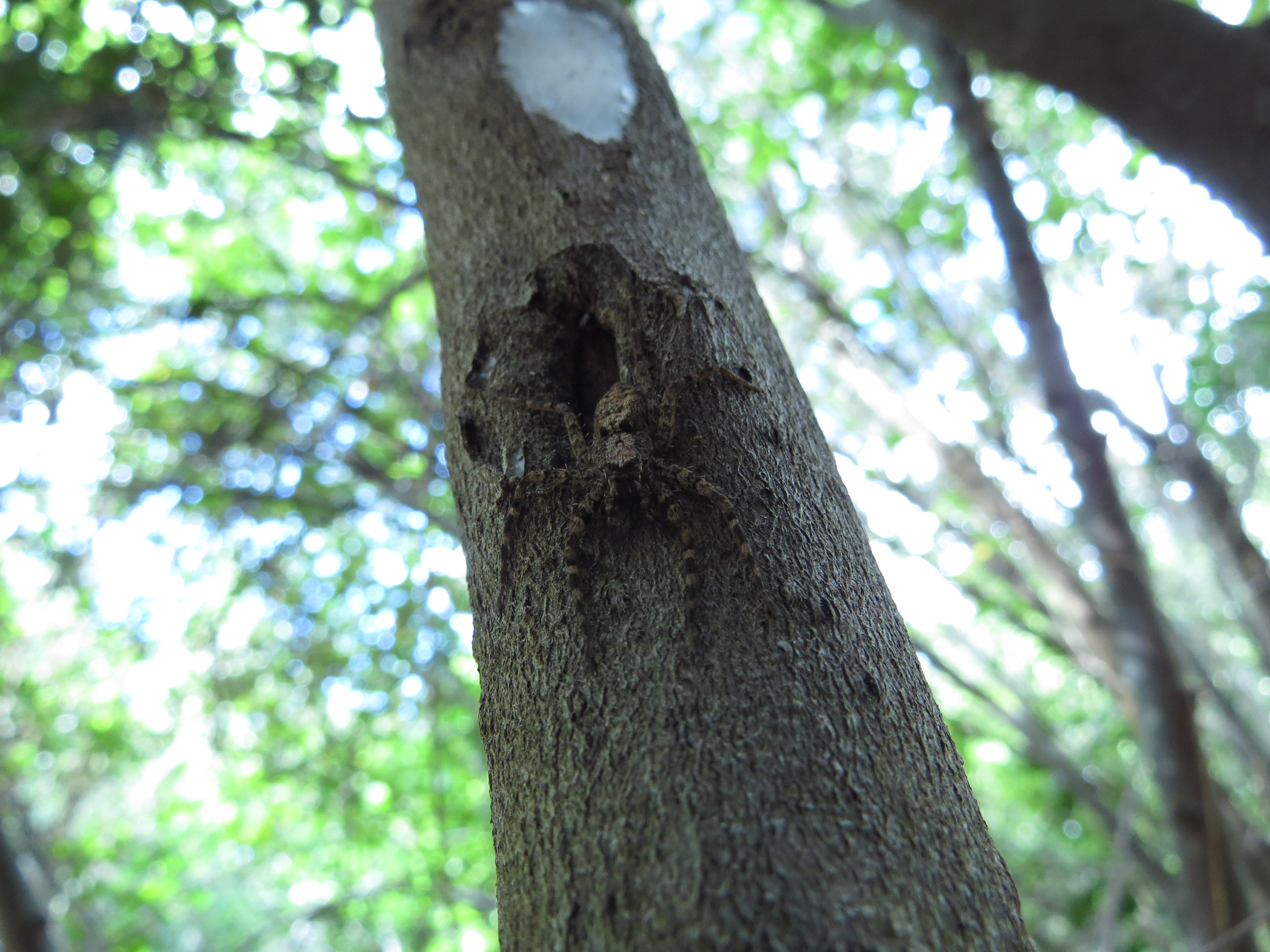
Anyphops sp.

Anyphops Benoit, 1968

- A. alticola (Lawrence, 1940) — South Africa
- A. amatolae (Lawrence, 1940) — South Africa
- A. atomarius (Simon, 1887) (type) — Southern Africa
- A. barbertonensis (Lawrence, 1940) — Somalia, South Africa
- A. barnardi (Lawrence, 1940) — Zimbabwe
- A. basutus (Pocock, 1901) — Lesotho
- A. bechuanicus (Lawrence, 1940) — Botswana
- A. benoiti Corronca, 1998 — Madagascar
- A. braunsi (Lawrence, 1940) — South Africa
- A. broomi (Pocock, 1900) — South Africa
- A. caledonicus (Lawrence, 1940) — South Africa
- A. capensis (Lawrence, 1940) — South Africa
- A. civicus (Lawrence, 1940) — South Africa
- A. decoratus (Lawrence, 1940) — South Africa
- A. dubiosus (Lawrence, 1952) — South Africa
- A. dulacen Corronca, 2000 — Namibia
- A. fitzsimonsi (Lawrence, 1940) — South Africa
- A. gilli (Lawrence, 1940) — South Africa
- A. helenae (Lawrence, 1940) — South Africa
- A. hessei (Lawrence, 1940) — South Africa
- A. hewitti (Lawrence, 1940) — South Africa
- A. immaculatus (Lawrence, 1940) — South Africa
- A. karrooicus (Lawrence, 1940) — South Africa
- A. kivuensis Benoit, 1968 — Congo
- A. kraussi (Pocock, 1898) — South Africa
- A. lawrencei (Roewer, 1951) — South Africa
- A. leleupi Benoit, 1972 — South Africa
- A. lesserti (Lawrence, 1940) — South Africa
- A. lignicola (Lawrence, 1937) — South Africa
- A. lochiel Corronca, 2000 — South Africa
- A. longipedatus (Roewer, 1955) — South Africa
- A. lucia Corronca, 2005 — South Africa
- A. lycosiformis (Lawrence, 1937) — South Africa
- A. maculosus (Lawrence, 1940) — South Africa
- A. marshalli (Pocock, 1902) — South Africa
- A. minor (Lawrence, 1940) — South Africa
- A. montanus (Lawrence, 1940) — South Africa
- A. mumai (Corronca, 1996) — South Africa
- A. namaquensis (Lawrence, 1940) — Namibia
- A. narcissi Benoit, 1972 — Eswatini
- A. natalensis (Lawrence, 1940) — South Africa
- A. ngome Corronca, 2005 — South Africa
- A. parvulus (Pocock, 1900) — Congo, South Africa
- A. phallus (Lawrence, 1952) — South Africa
- A. pococki (Lawrence, 1940) — South Africa
- A. purcelli (Lawrence, 1940) — South Africa
- A. regalis (Lawrence, 1940) — South Africa
- A. reservatus (Lawrence, 1937) — South Africa
- A. rubicundus (Lawrence, 1940) — South Africa
- A. schoenlandi (Pocock, 1902) — South Africa
- A. septemspinatus (Lawrence, 1937) — South Africa
- A. septentrionalis Benoit, 1975 — Cameroon
- A. sexspinatus (Lawrence, 1940) — Namibia
- A. silvicolellus (Strand, 1913) — Central Africa
- A. smithersi (Lawrence, 1940) — Lesotho
- A. spenceri (Pocock, 1896) — South Africa
- A. sponsae (Lessert, 1933) — Congo, Angola
- A. stauntoni (Pocock, 1902) — St. Helena, South Africa
- A. stridulans (Lawrence, 1940) — South Africa
- A. thornei (Lawrence, 1940) — South Africa
- A. transvaalicus (Lawrence, 1940) — South Africa
- A. tuckeri (Lawrence, 1940) — South Africa
- A. tugelanus (Lawrence, 1942) — South Africa
- A. whiteae (Pocock, 1902) — South Africa

== Garcorops ==
Garcorops Corronca, 2003

- G. jocquei Corronca, 2003 — Comoros
- G. madagascar Corronca, 2003 (type) — Madagascar
- G. paulyi Corronca, 2003 — Madagascar
- † G. jadis Bosselaers, 2004 — Quaternary Madagascan copal

== Godumops ==
Godumops Crews & Harvey, 2011

- G. caritus Crews & Harvey, 2011 (type) — New Guinea

== Hovops ==
Hovops Benoit, 1968

- H. antakarana Rodríguez & Corronca, 2014 — Madagascar
- H. betsileo Corronca & Rodríguez, 2011 — Madagascar
- H. ikongo Rodríguez & Corronca, 2014 — Madagascar
- H. legrasi (Simon, 1887) — Madagascar
- H. lidiae Corronca & Rodríguez, 2011 — Madagascar
- H. madagascariensis (Vinson, 1863) — Madagascar
- H. mariensis (Strand, 1908) — Madagascar
- H. menabe Rodríguez & Corronca, 2014 — Madagascar
- H. merina Corronca & Rodríguez, 2011 — Madagascar
- H. pusillus (Simon, 1887) (type) — Madagascar
- H. vezo Rodríguez & Corronca, 2014 — Madagascar

== Karaops ==
Karaops

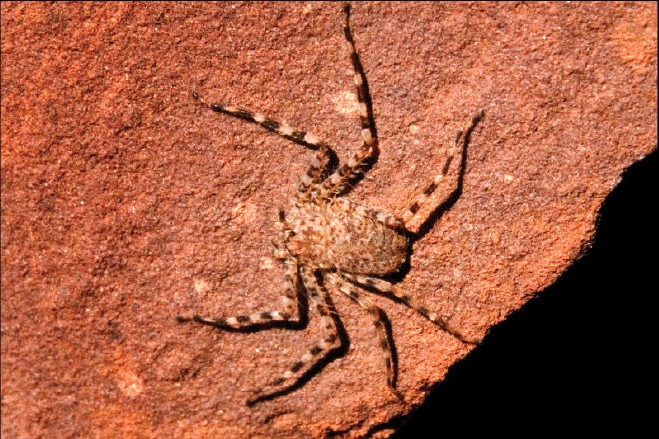
Karaops badgeradda

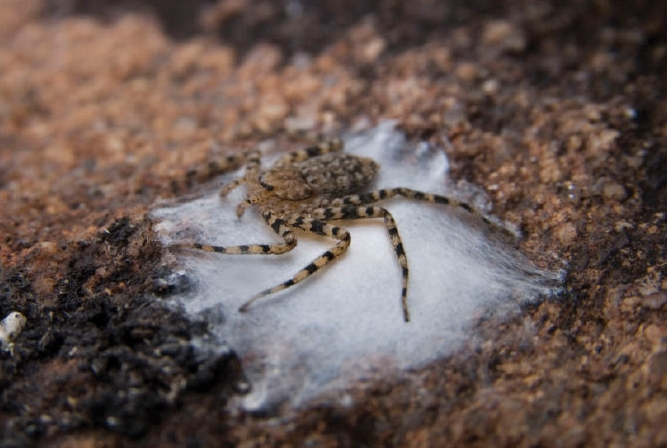
Karaops francesae

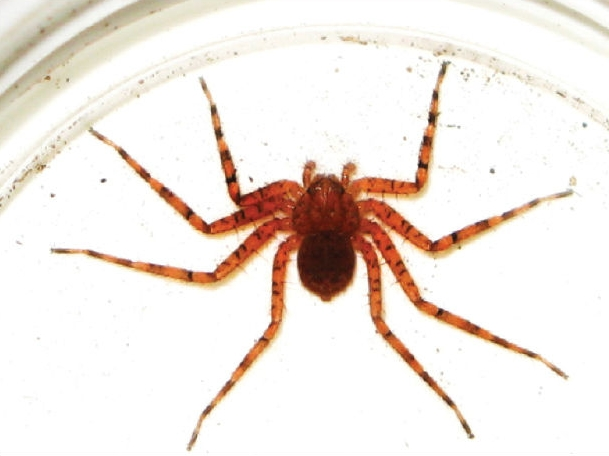
Karaops martamarta

Karaops Crews & Harvey, 2011

- K. alanlongbottomi Crews & Harvey, 2011 — Australia (Western Australia)
- K. australiensis (L. Koch, 1875) — Australia (Queensland)
- K. badgeradda Crews & Harvey, 2011 — Australia (Western Australia)
- K. banyjima Crews, 2013 — Australia (Western Australia)
- K. burbidgei Crews & Harvey, 2011 — Australia (Western Australia)
- K. dawara Crews & Harvey, 2011 — Australia (Northern Territory)
- K. deserticola Crews & Harvey, 2011 — Australia (South Australia)
- K. ellenae Crews & Harvey, 2011 (type) — Australia (Western Australia)
- K. feedtime Crews, 2013 — Australia (Western Australia)
- K. forteyi Crews, 2013 — Australia (Western Australia)
- K. francesae Crews & Harvey, 2011 — Australia (Western Australia)
- K. gangarie Crews & Harvey, 2011 — Australia (Queensland)
- K. jaburrara Crews, 2013 — Australia (Western Australia)
- K. jarrit Crews & Harvey, 2011 — Australia (Western Australia)
- K. jenniferae Crews & Harvey, 2011 — Australia (Western Australia)
- K. julianneae Crews & Harvey, 2011 — Australia (Western Australia)
- K. kariyarra Crews, 2013 — Australia (Western Australia)
- K. karrawarla Crews & Harvey, 2011 — Australia (Western Australia)
- K. keithlongbottomi Crews & Harvey, 2011 — Australia (Western Australia)
- K. larryoo Crews & Harvey, 2011 — Australia (Western Australia)
- K. manaayn Crews & Harvey, 2011 — Australia (New South Wales)
- K. marrayagong Crews & Harvey, 2011 — Australia (New South Wales)
- K. martamarta Crews & Harvey, 2011 — Australia (Western Australia)
- K. monteithi Crews & Harvey, 2011 — Australia (Queensland)
- K. ngarluma Crews, 2013 — Australia (Western Australia)
- K. ngarutjaranya Crews & Harvey, 2011 — Australia (South Australia)
- K. nyamal Crews, 2013 — Australia (Western Australia)
- K. nyangumarta Crews, 2013 — Australia (Western Australia)
- K. nyiyaparli Crews, 2013 — Australia (Western Australia)
- K. pilkingtoni Crews & Harvey, 2011 — Australia (Northern Territory)
- K. raveni Crews & Harvey, 2011 — Australia (Queensland, New South Wales)
- K. toolbrunup Crews & Harvey, 2011 — Australia (Western Australia)
- K. umiida Crews, 2013 — Australia (Western Australia)
- K. vadlaadambara Crews & Harvey, 2011 — Australia (South Australia)
- K. yindjibarndi Crews, 2013 — Australia (Western Australia)
- K. yumbu Crews, 2013 — Australia (Western Australia)
- K. yurlburr Crews, 2013 — Australia (Western Australia)

== Makdiops ==
Makdiops Crews & Harvey, 2011

- M. agumbensis (Tikader, 1969) — India
- M. mahishasura Crews & Harvey, 2011 — India
- M. montigena (Simon, 1889) (type) — India, Nepal
- M. nilgirensis (Reimoser, 1934) — India
- M. shevaroyensis (Gravely, 1931) — India
- M. shiva Crews & Harvey, 2011 — India

== Selenops ==
Selenops

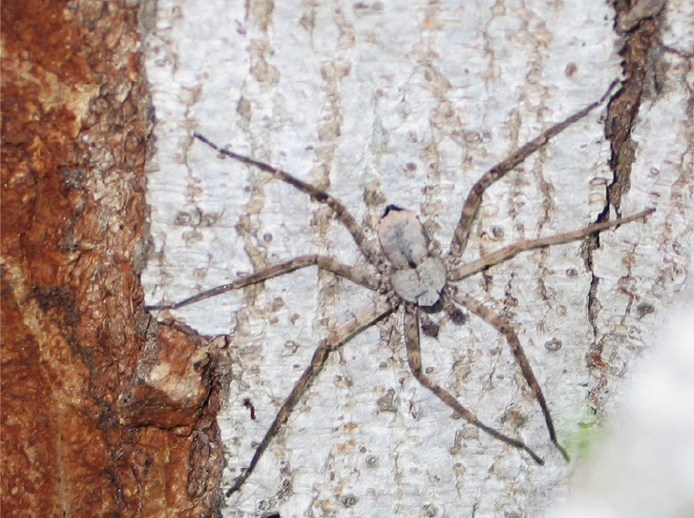
Selenops baweka

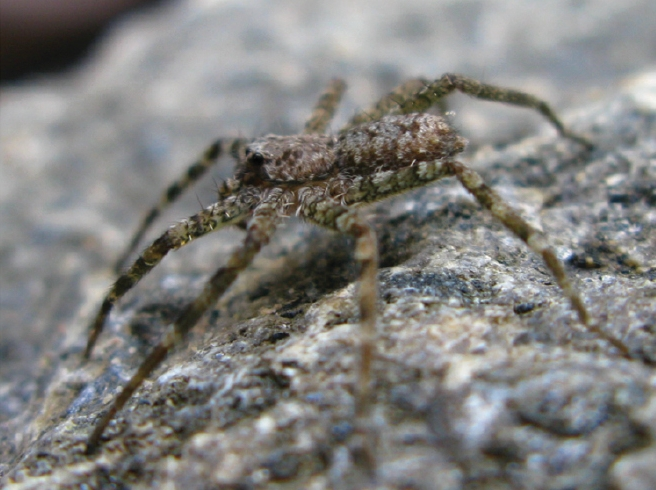
Selenops bifurcatus

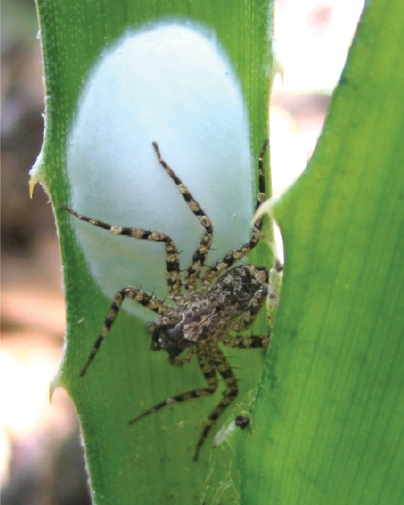
Selenops geraldinae

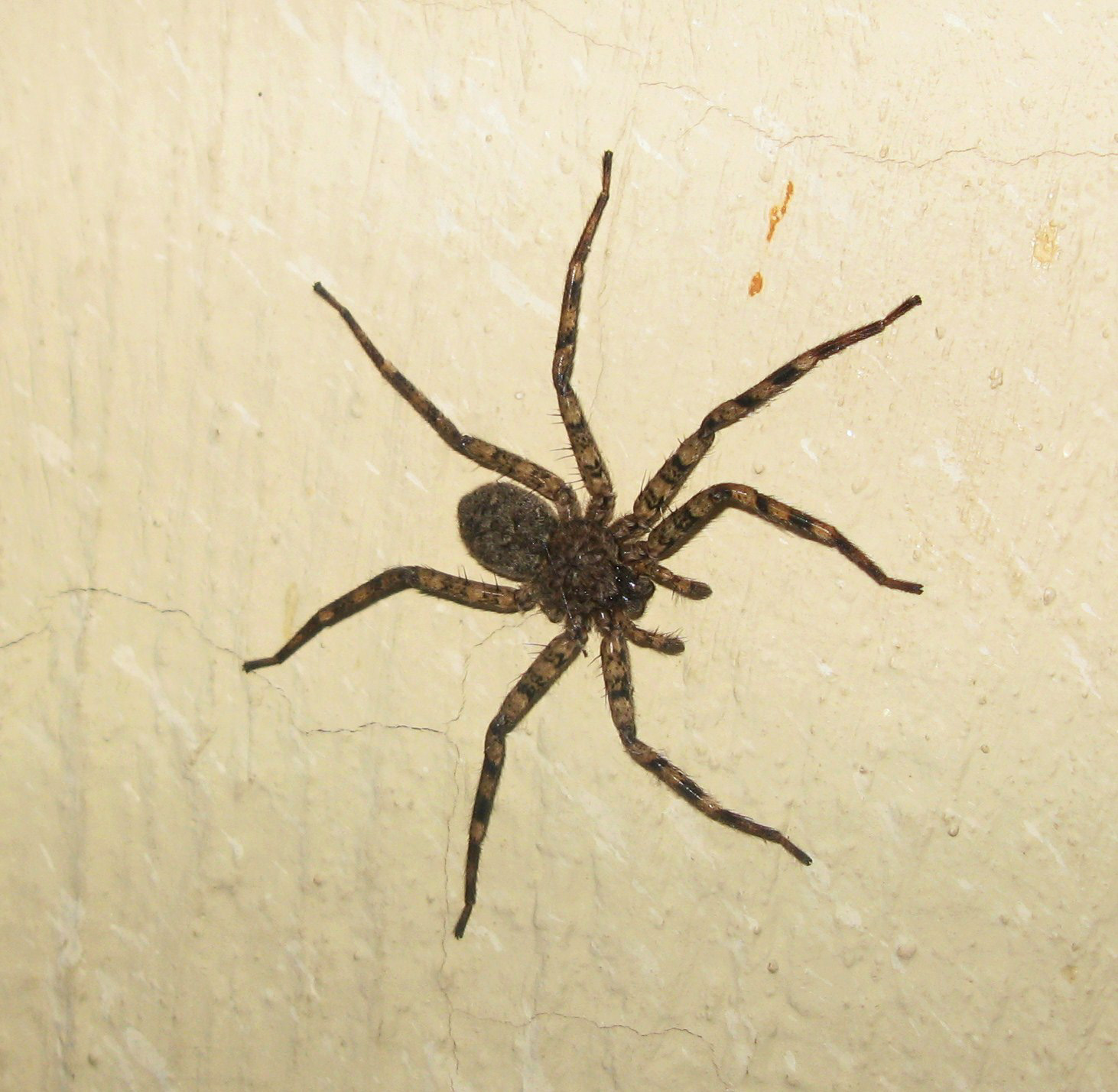
Selenops gracilis

Selenops Latreille, 1819

- S. ab Logunov & Jäger, 2015 — Vietnam
- S. abyssus Muma, 1953 — Mexico
- S. actophilus Chamberlin, 1924 — USA, Mexico
- S. aequalis Franganillo, 1935 — Cuba
- S. aissus Walckenaer, 1837 — USA, Bahama Is., Cuba
- S. alemani Muma, 1953 — Cuba
- S. amona Crews, 2011 — Puerto Rico
- S. anacaona Crews, 2018 — Hispaniola (Dominican Rep.)
- S. angelae Corronca, 1998 — Ecuador
- S. angolaensis Corronca, 2002 — Angola
- S. annulatus Simon, 1876 — Cameroon to Tanzania
- S. ansieae Corronca, 2002 — South Africa
- S. arikok Crews, 2011 — Colombia, Aruba
- S. aztecus Valdez-Mondragón, 2010 — Mexico
- S. bani Alayón, 1992 — Hispaniola
- S. banksi Muma, 1953 — Panama, Guyana, Peru
- S. bastet Zamani & Crews, 2019 — Egypt
- S. baweka Crews, 2011 — Turks & Caicos Is.
- S. bifurcatus Banks, 1909 — Guatemala to Costa Rica
- S. bocacanadensis Crews, 2011 — Hispaniola (Dominican Rep.)
- S. brachycephalus Lawrence, 1940 — Zimbabwe, South Africa
- S. bursarius Karsch, 1879 — China, Korea, Taiwan, Japan
- S. buscki Muma, 1953 — Panama
- S. cabagan Alayón, 2005 — Cuba
- S. camerun Corronca, 2001 — Cameroon
- S. canasta Alayón, 2005 — Cuba
- S. candidus Muma, 1953 — Jamaica
- S. caney Alayón, 2005 — Cuba
- S. caonabo Crews, 2018 — Hispaniola (Dominican Rep.)
- S. chamela Crews, 2011 — Mexico
- S. cocheleti Simon, 1880 — Panama to Argentina
- S. comorensis Schmidt & Krause, 1994 — Comoros
- S. cristis Corronca, 2002 — Ghana or Namibia
- S. curazao Alayón, 2001 — Bonaire, Curaçao
- S. debilis Banks, 1898 — USA, Mexico
- S. denia Crews, 2011 — Hispaniola
- S. dilamen Corronca, 2002 — Congo
- S. dilon Corronca, 2002 — South Africa
- S. duan Crews, 2011 — Hispaniola
- S. ducke Corronca, 1996 — Brazil
- S. dufouri Vinson, 1863 — Madagascar, Réunion
- S. ecuadorensis Berland, 1913 — Ecuador
- S. ef Jäger, 2019 — Cambodia
- S. enriquillo Crews, 2011 — Jamaica, Hispaniola
- S. feron Corronca, 2002 — South Africa
- S. florenciae Corronca, 2002 — Angola
- S. formosus Bryant, 1940 — Cuba
- S. geraldinae Corronca, 1996 — Brazil, Colombia, Venezuela, Trinidad
- S. gracilis Muma, 1953 — Mexico
- S. guerrero Crews, 2011 — Hispaniola
- S. hebraicus Mello-Leitão, 1945 — Brazil, Paraguay, Argentina
- S. huetocatl Crews, 2011 — Mexico
- S. iberia Alayón, 2005 — Cuba
- S. ilcuria Corronca, 2002 — Cameroon, South Africa
- S. imias Alayón, 2005 — Cuba
- S. insularis Keyserling, 1881 — USA, Greater Antilles
- S. intricatus Simon, 1910 — West, Central Africa
- S. isopodus Mello-Leitão, 1941 — Colombia
- S. ivohibe Corronca, 2005 — Madagascar
- S. ixchel Crews, 2011 — Mexico
- S. jocquei Corronca, 2005 — Ivory Coast
- S. juxtlahuaca Valdez, 2007 — Mexico
- S. kalinago Crews, 2011 — Lesser Antilles
- S. kikay Corronca, 1996 — Brazil
- S. kruegeri Lawrence, 1940 — Southern Africa
- S. lavillai Corronca, 1996 — Venezuela, Peru, Brazil
- S. lepidus Muma, 1953 — Mexico
- S. lesnei Lessert, 1936 — East, Southern Africa
- S. levii Corronca, 1997 — Brazil
- S. lindborgi Petrunkevitch, 1926 — Caribbean
- S. littoricola Strand, 1913 — Central Africa
- S. lobatse Corronca, 2001 — South Africa
- S. lucibel Corronca, 2002 — Southern Africa
- S. lumbo Corronca, 2001 — East Africa
- S. makimaki Crews, 2011 — Mexico
- S. malinalxochitl Crews, 2011 — Mexico
- S. manzanoae Corronca, 1997 — Brazil
- S. maranhensis Mello-Leitão, 1918 — Brazil, Bolivia, Paraguay, Argentina
- S. marcanoi Alayón, 1992 — Hispaniola
- S. marginalis F. O. Pickard-Cambridge, 1900 — Mexico
- S. marilus Corronca, 1998 — Venezuela
- S. melanurus Mello-Leitão, 1923 — Brazil
- S. mexicanus Keyserling, 1880 — USA to Colombia, Galapagos Is.
- S. micropalpus Muma, 1953 — Lesser Antilles (Martinique, Dominica, Saint Lucia, Saint Vincent and the Grenadines)
- S. minutus F. O. Pickard-Cambridge, 1900 — Guatemala
- S. morosus Banks, 1898 — Mexico
- S. morro Crews, 2011 — Hispaniola (Dominican Rep.)
- S. muehlmannorum Jäger & Praxaysombath, 2011 — Laos
- S. nesophilus Chamberlin, 1924 — USA, Mexico
- S. nigromaculatus Keyserling, 1880 — Mexico
- S. occultus Mello-Leitão, 1918 — Brazil, Paraguay, Argentina
- S. oculatus Pocock, 1898 — Yemen
- S. ollarius Zhu, Sha & Chen, 1990 — China
- S. onka Corronca, 2005 — Angola, Namibia
- S. oricuajo Crews, 2011 — Costa Rica
- S. ovambicus Lawrence, 1940 — West, East, Southern Africa
- S. oviedo Crews, 2011 — Hispaniola
- S. para Corronca, 1996 — Brazil
- S. pensilis Muma, 1953 — Hispaniola (Haiti, Dominican Rep.)
- S. peraltae Corronca, 1997 — Bolivia
- S. petenajtoy Crews, 2011 — Guatemala
- S. petrunkevitchi Alayón, 2003 — Jamaica
- S. phaselus Muma, 1953 — Hispaniola
- S. pygmaeus Benoit, 1975 — Ivory Coast, Congo
- S. radiatus Latreille, 1819 (type) — Mediterranean, Africa, Middle East, India, Myanmar, China
- S. rapax Mello-Leitão, 1929 — Brazil, Argentina
- S. rosario Alayón, 2005 — Cuba
- S. sabulosus Benoit, 1968 — Djibouti
- S. saldali Corronca, 2002 — Ghana, Nigeria
- S. scitus Muma, 1953 — Mexico
- S. secretus Hirst, 1911 — Seychelles
- S. siboney Alayón, 2005 — Cuba
- S. simius Muma, 1953 — Bahama Is., Cuba, Cayman Is.
- S. souliga Crews, 2011 — Lesser Antilles (Anguilla, Saint-Martin, Sint Maarten, Saint Barthélemy)
- S. spixi Perty, 1833 — Brazil, Uruguay, Argentina
- S. submaculosus Bryant, 1940 — USA, Bahamas, Cuba, Cayman Is.
- S. tenebrosus Lawrence, 1940 — Zimbabwe, South Africa
- S. tiky Corronca, 1998 — Venezuela
- S. tomsici Corronca, 1996 — Peru
- S. tonteldoos Corronca, 2005 — South Africa
- S. trifidus Bryant, 1948 — Caribbean (Navassa Is.)
- S. vigilans Pocock, 1898 — West, Central, East Africa, Madagascar
- S. vinalesi Muma, 1953 — Cuba
- S. viron Corronca, 2002 — Kenya
- S. willinki Corronca, 1996 — Trinidad
- S. wilmotorum Crews, 2011 — Jamaica
- S. wilsoni Crews, 2011 — Jamaica
- S. ximenae Corronca, 1997 — Brazil
- S. zairensis Benoit, 1968 — Congo, Ivory Coast, Angola
- S. zuluanus Lawrence, 1940 — Zimbabwe, Botswana, South Africa
- S. zumac Corronca, 1996 — Brazil
- † S. benoiti Wunderlich, 2004
- † S. beynai Schawaller, 1984
- † S. dominicanus Wunderlich, 2004

== Siamspinops ==
Siamspinops

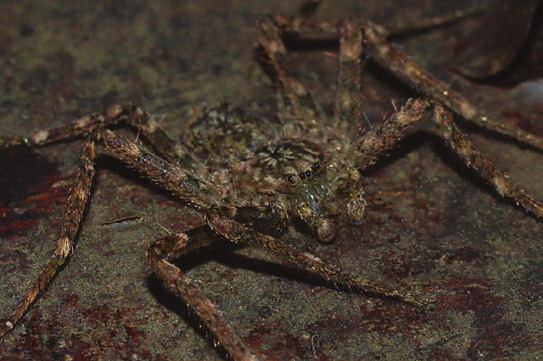
Siamspinops formosensis

Siamspinops Dankittipakul & Corronca, 2009

- S. aculeatus (Simon, 1901) — Malaysia
- S. allospinosus Dankittipakul & Corronca, 2009 — Thailand
- S. formosensis (Kayashima, 1943) — Taiwan
- S. spinescens Dankittipakul & Corronca, 2009 — Malaysia
- S. spinosissimus Dankittipakul & Corronca, 2009 (type) — Thailand
- S. spinosus Dankittipakul & Corronca, 2009 — Thailand
