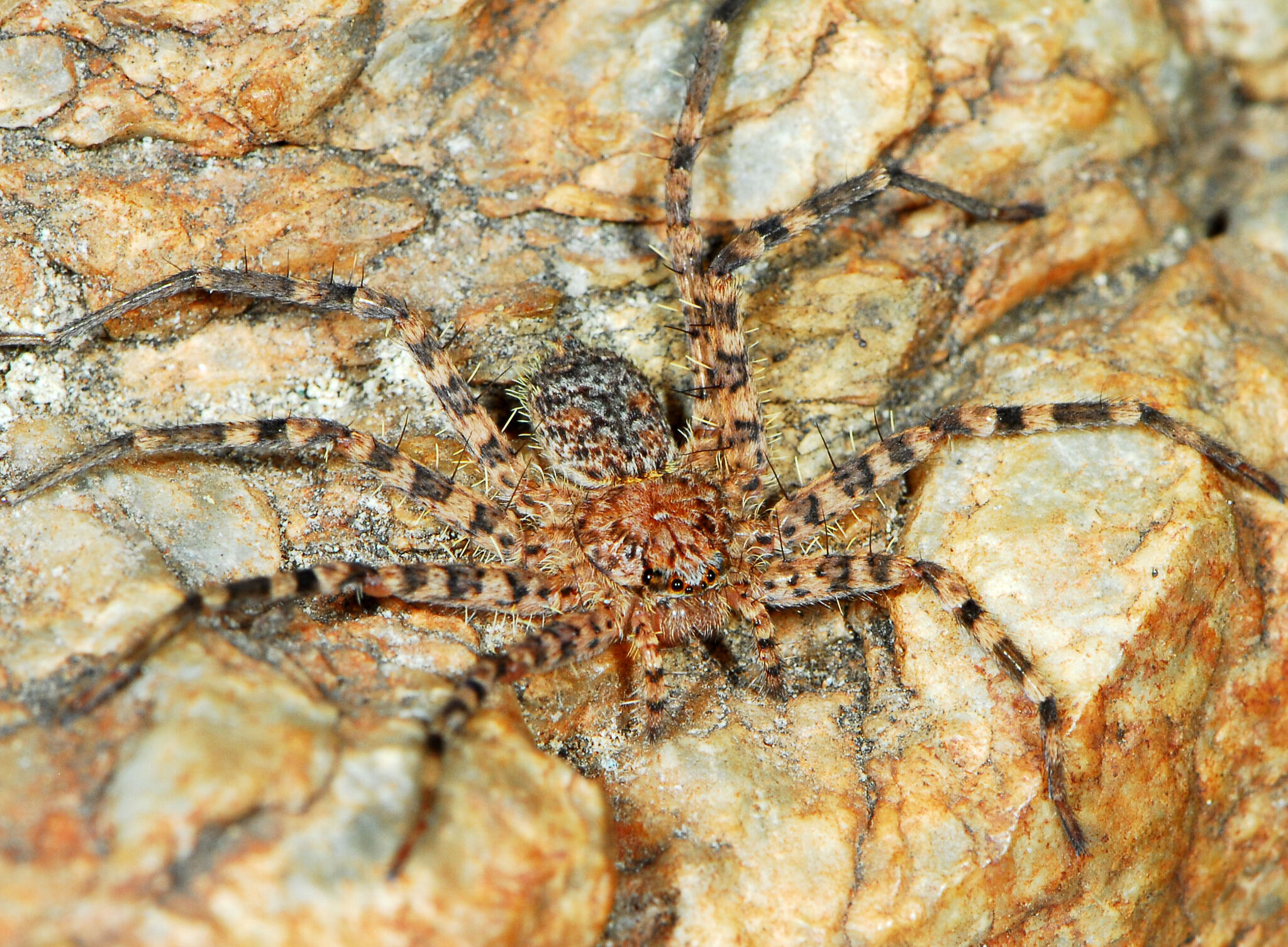
- Female
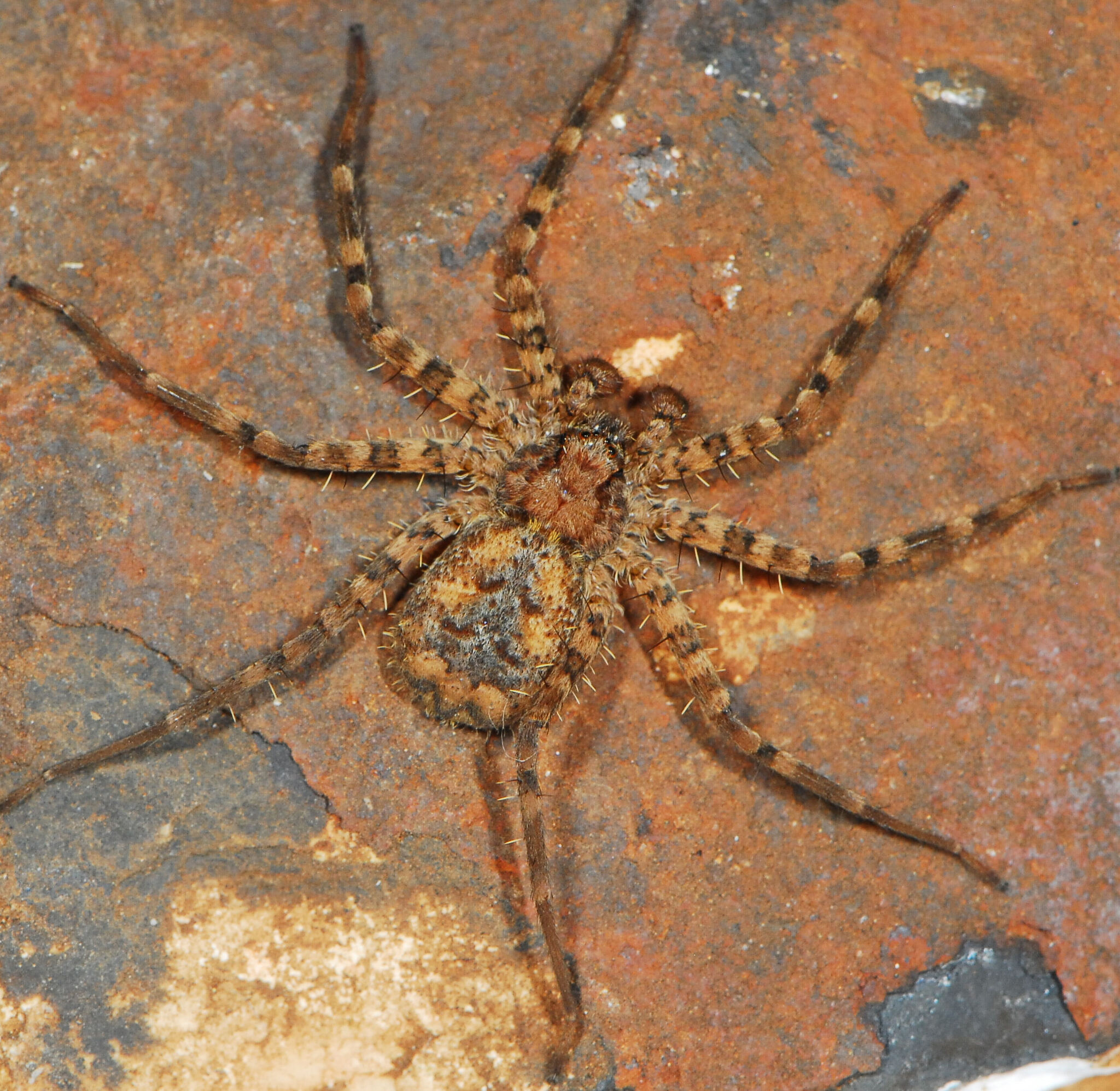
- Male

Scientific classification
- Kingdom: Animalia
- Phylum: Arthropoda
- Subphylum: Chelicerata
- Class: Arachnida
- Order: Araneae
- Infraorder: Araneomorphae
- Family: Selenopidae
- Genus: Anyphops
- Species: A. lawrencei

Binomial name
- Anyphops lawrencei (Roewer, 1951)

Synonyms
- Selenops pusillus Lawrence, 1947

= Anyphops lawrencei =

Zululand Anyphops Flat Spider

Species of spider

Anyphops lawrencei is a species of spider in the family Selenopidae. It occurs in South Africa and Zimbabwe and is commonly known as Zululand Anyphops flat spider.

== Distribution ==
Anyphops lawrencei occurs in South Africa and Zimbabwe.

In South Africa, it is known from the provinces Free State, Gauteng, and KwaZulu-Natal. Notable localities include Golden Gate Highlands National Park, Hluhluwe-iMfolozi Park, and various nature reserves around Pretoria.

== Habitat and ecology ==
The species inhabits Forest, Indian Ocean Coastal Belt, Grassland, and Savanna biomes at altitudes ranging from 112 to 1920 m above sea level. These are free-living cryptozoic nocturnal ground living spiders that are frequently found under rocks and have been collected from pitfall traps in open and dense indigenous forest.

== Description ==
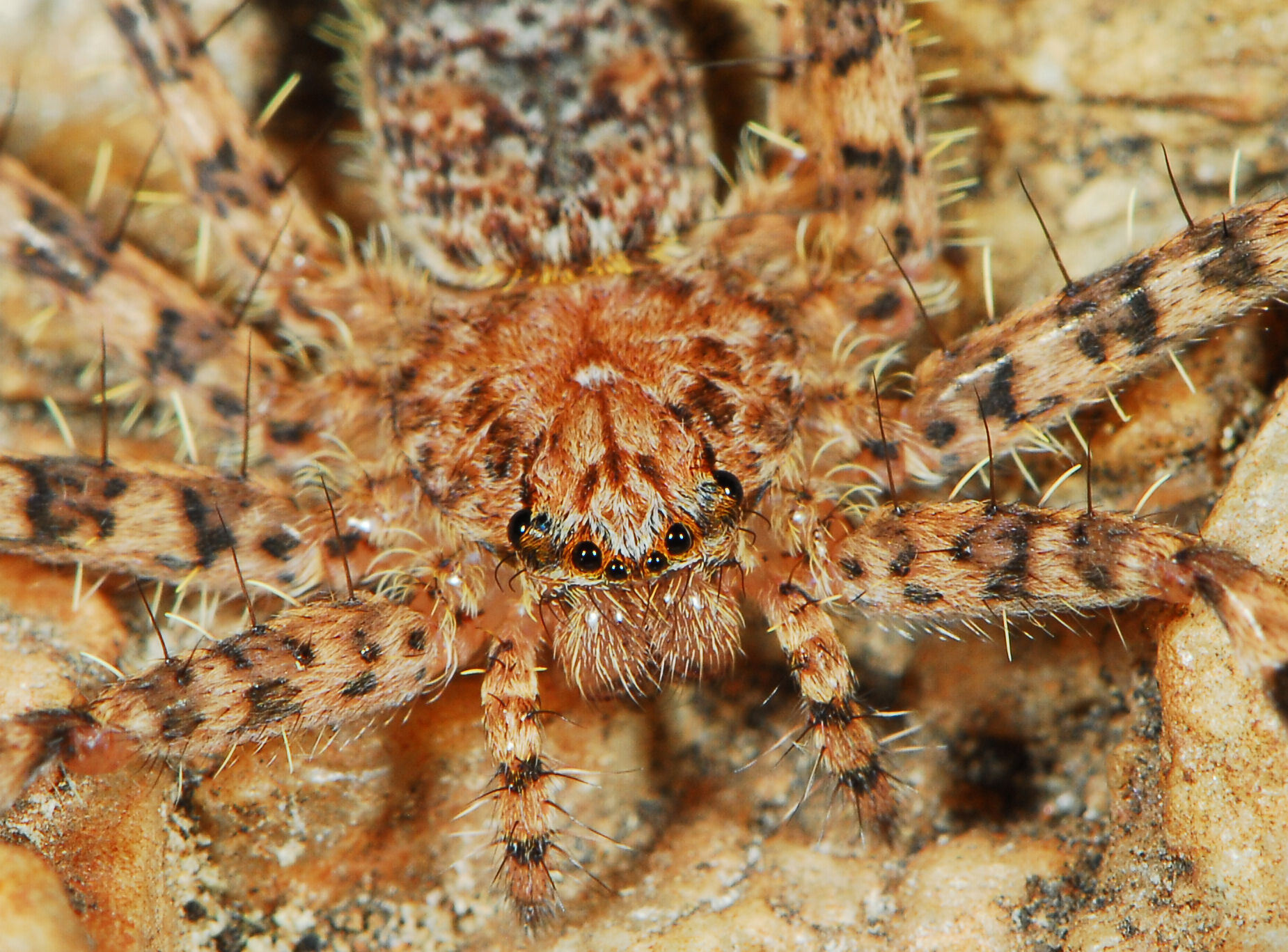
female

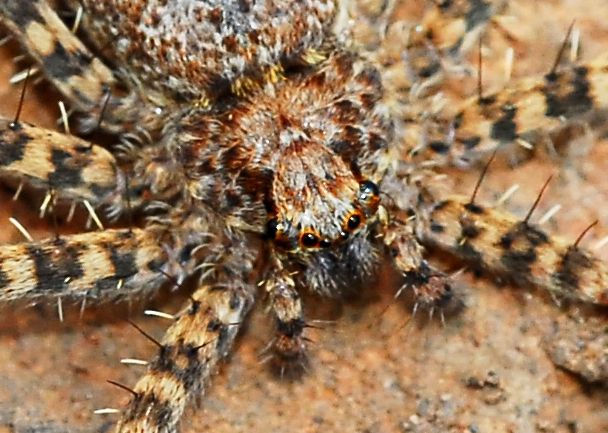
male

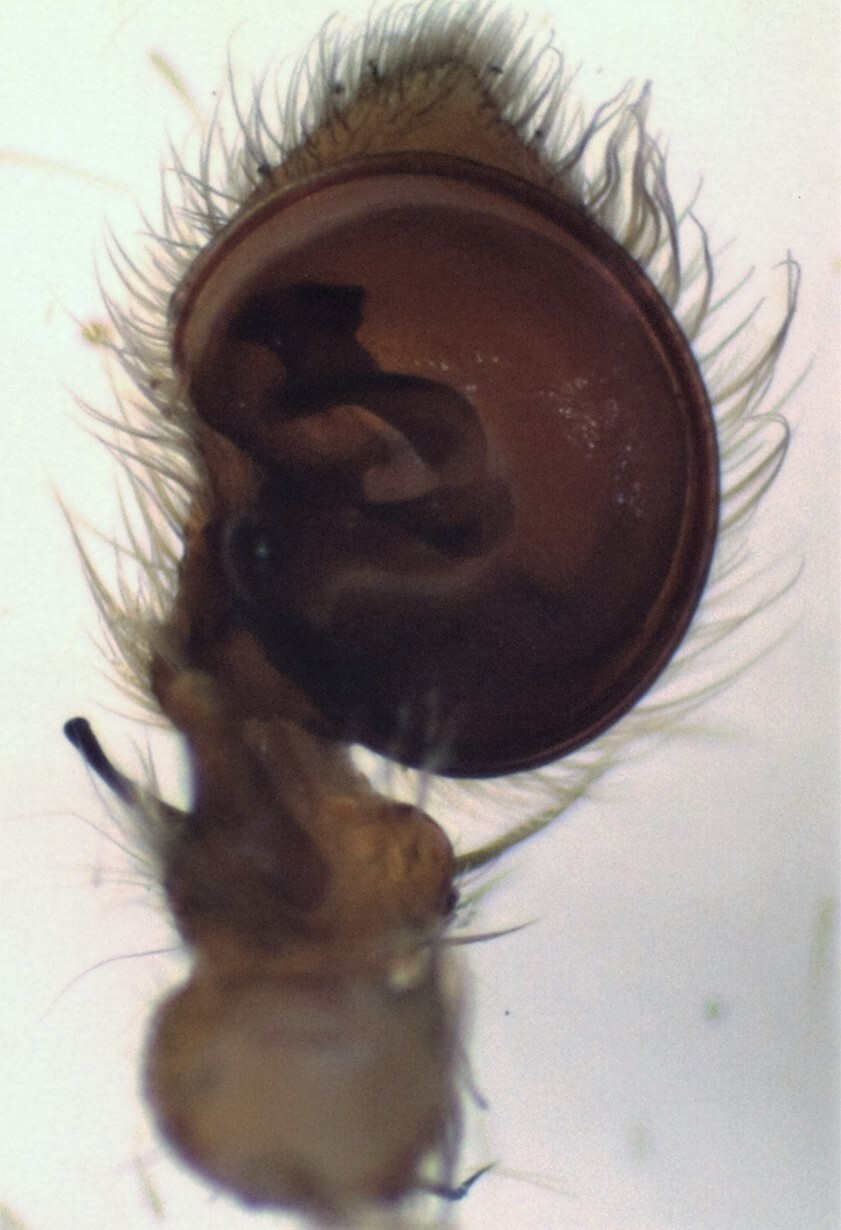
male palp

The species nown from both sexes. The carapace is orange-brown with lateral dark grey markings, and the chelicerae are orange-brown. The legs are pale orange-brown with markings on femora I–II forming two incomplete rings, while femora III–IV have two prolateral dark grey parallel lines limiting a pale and narrow band.

The dorsal opisthosoma is dark brown with yellowish spots and a typical posterior transversal light band, while the venter is light grey. The anterior tibiae have 5 pairs of spines, anterior metatarsi with 3, and femora above with 3 very long and more or less erect blackish spines.

Total length is 5-6 mm.

== Conservation ==
Anyphops lawrencei is listed as Least Concern due to its wide geographical range. The species is protected in multiple reserves including Klipriviersberg Nature Reserve, Suikerbosrand Nature Reserve, Golden Gate Highlands National Park, Rietvleidam Nature Reserve, and uMkhuze Game Reserve.

== Taxonomy ==
This species was originally described by Lawrence in 1947 as Selenops pusillus, but this name was preoccupied by an earlier use by Simon in 1887. Roewer provided the replacement name lawrencei in 1951. The species was later transferred to the genus Anyphops by Benoit in 1968 and was revised by Corronca in 2005.
