= Anyphops caledonicus =

Scientific classification
- Kingdom: Animalia
- Phylum: Arthropoda
- Subphylum: Chelicerata
- Class: Arachnida
- Order: Araneae
- Infraorder: Araneomorphae
- Family: Selenopidae
- Genus: Anyphops
- Species: A. caledonicus

Binomial name
- Anyphops caledonicus (Lawrence, 1940)

Species of spider

Anyphops caledonicus is a species of spider in the family Selenopidae. It is endemic to South Africa.

== Distribution ==
Anyphops caledonicus is found in South Africa. The species is endemic to the Western Cape, known from Caledon and Bontebok National Park at 237 m above sea level.

== Habitat and ecology ==
The species inhabits the Fynbos biome. Little is known about their behaviour.

== Description ==
The species is known only from females. The carapace is light yellow-brown with a Y-shaped darker marking formed by the thoracic striae and posterior boundaries of the cephalic area, with a few small dark spots halfway between the striae and lateral margins.

The opisthosoma above has 3 pairs of short curved blackish bars. There are well-defined brown bands on femora and tibiae of all legs. Tibia I and II have 5, metatarsus I and II have 3 pairs of inferior spines. Total length is 7-8 mm.

== Conservation ==
Anyphops caledonicus is listed as Data Deficient for taxonomic reasons. The status of the species remains obscure. More sampling is needed to collect males and determine the species' range. It is protected in Bontebok National Park.

== Taxonomy ==
The species was originally described by R. F. Lawrence in 1940 as Selenops caledonicus from Caledon. It was transferred to the genus Anyphops by Benoit in 1968.
