= Anyphops gilli =

Uitenhage Anyphops Flat Spider

Conservation status
- Least Concern (SANBI Red List)

Scientific classification
- Kingdom: Animalia
- Phylum: Arthropoda
- Subphylum: Chelicerata
- Class: Arachnida
- Order: Araneae
- Infraorder: Araneomorphae
- Family: Selenopidae
- Genus: Anyphops
- Species: A. gilli

Binomial name
- Anyphops gilli (Lawrence, 1940)

Species of spider

Anyphops gilli is a species of spider in the family Selenopidae. It is endemic to South Africa and is commonly known as Uitenhage Anyphops flat spider.

== Distribution ==
Anyphops gilli occurs in three South African provinces: Eastern Cape, KwaZulu-Natal, and Western Cape. Notable localities include Uitenhage, Hogsback in the Amatola Mountains, iSimangaliso Wetland Park, and Ngome State Forest.

== Habitat and ecology ==
The species inhabits Forest, Savanna, and Thicket biomes at altitudes ranging from 45 to 1307 m above sea level. These are free-living cryptozoic nocturnal spiders that have been sampled with pitfall traps and from leaf litter in dry-humid wet forest.

== Description ==
Known only from the male. The carapace is light reddish brown and a little darker anteriorly, with thoracic striae brown and some fine long radiating lines from it. The cephalic region is bisected by a light brown line which is duplicated for most of its length, and the chelicerae are a little darker than the carapace.

The opisthosoma has some brown spots and wavy cross-bars over most of its surface, with a transverse, procurved, fairly broad black stripe near its posterior extremity. The anterior tibiae have 6 pairs of inferior spines.

Total length is 8.6 mm.

== Conservation ==
Anyphops gilli is listed as Least Concern due to its wide geographical range. The species is protected in three State Forests, though more sampling is needed to collect the female.

== Taxonomy ==
The species was originally described by Lawrence in 1940 as Selenops gilli from Uitenhage in the Eastern Cape. It was later transferred to the genus Anyphops by Benoit in 1968.
