= Anyphops namaquensis =

Namakwa Anyphops Wall Spider

Conservation status
- Least Concern (SANBI Red List)

Scientific classification
- Kingdom: Animalia
- Phylum: Arthropoda
- Subphylum: Chelicerata
- Class: Arachnida
- Order: Araneae
- Infraorder: Araneomorphae
- Family: Selenopidae
- Genus: Anyphops
- Species: A. namaquensis

Binomial name
- Anyphops namaquensis (Lawrence, 1940)

Species of spider

Anyphops namaquensis is a species of spider in the family Selenopidae. It is endemic to South Africa and is commonly known as the Namakwa Anyphops wall spider.

== Distribution ==
Anyphops namaquensis occurs in two South African provinces: Northern Cape and Western Cape. It has been recorded from Lekkersing, Kamieskroon in Namaqualand, and Richtersveld National Park in the Northern Cape, and 38 km north of Bitterfontein in the Western Cape at altitudes ranging from 234 to 751 m above sea level.

== Habitat and ecology ==
The species inhabits the Desert and Succulent Karoo biomes and is a free-living cryptozoic nocturnal ground-dwelling spider.

== Description ==
Both sexes are known. The carapace is light reddish brown with fine long black radiations from the thoracic striae, a short black bar behind each posterior lateral eye, and an indistinct row of brown submarginal dots. The chelicerae are slightly darker than the carapace.

The abdomen above is light brown, darker posteriorly, with minute scattered black dots and a few large symmetrical spots above the spinnerets.

The legs differ from other species in this group by having one instead of two black bands on the tibiae, occupying the basal two-thirds of the segment. The femora have vague brownish blotches, the sides of patellae are black with the remainder brown, the anterior metatarsi are black, and the posterior ones are lighter. The anterior tibiae have 5 pairs of inferior spines.

Total length is 9.2 mm.

== Conservation ==
Anyphops namaquensis is listed as Least Concern. The species is sampled from a poorly known part of the country where extensive natural habitat remains, and it is suspected to occur more widely in Namaqualand. It is protected in Richtersveld National Park.
