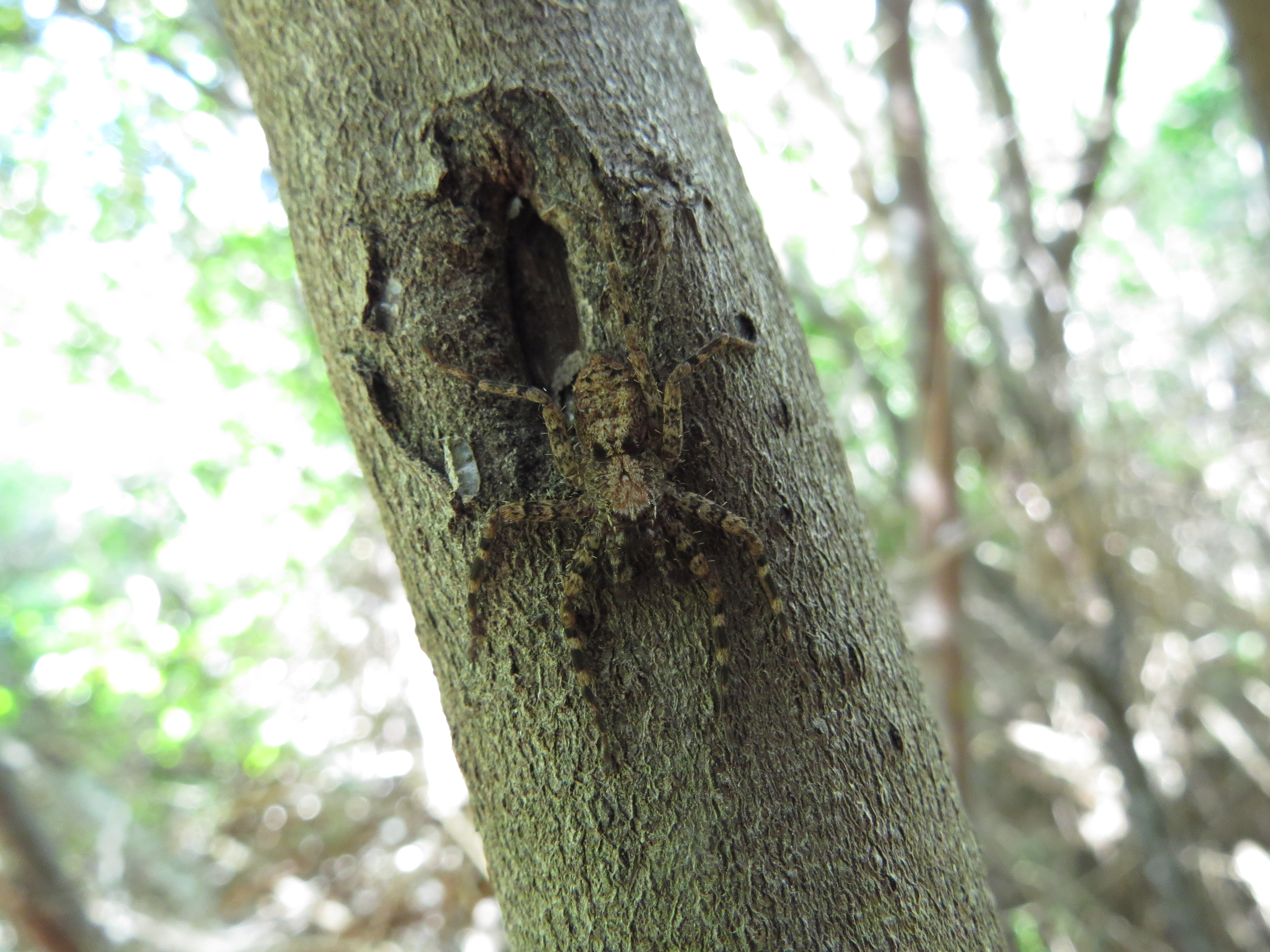

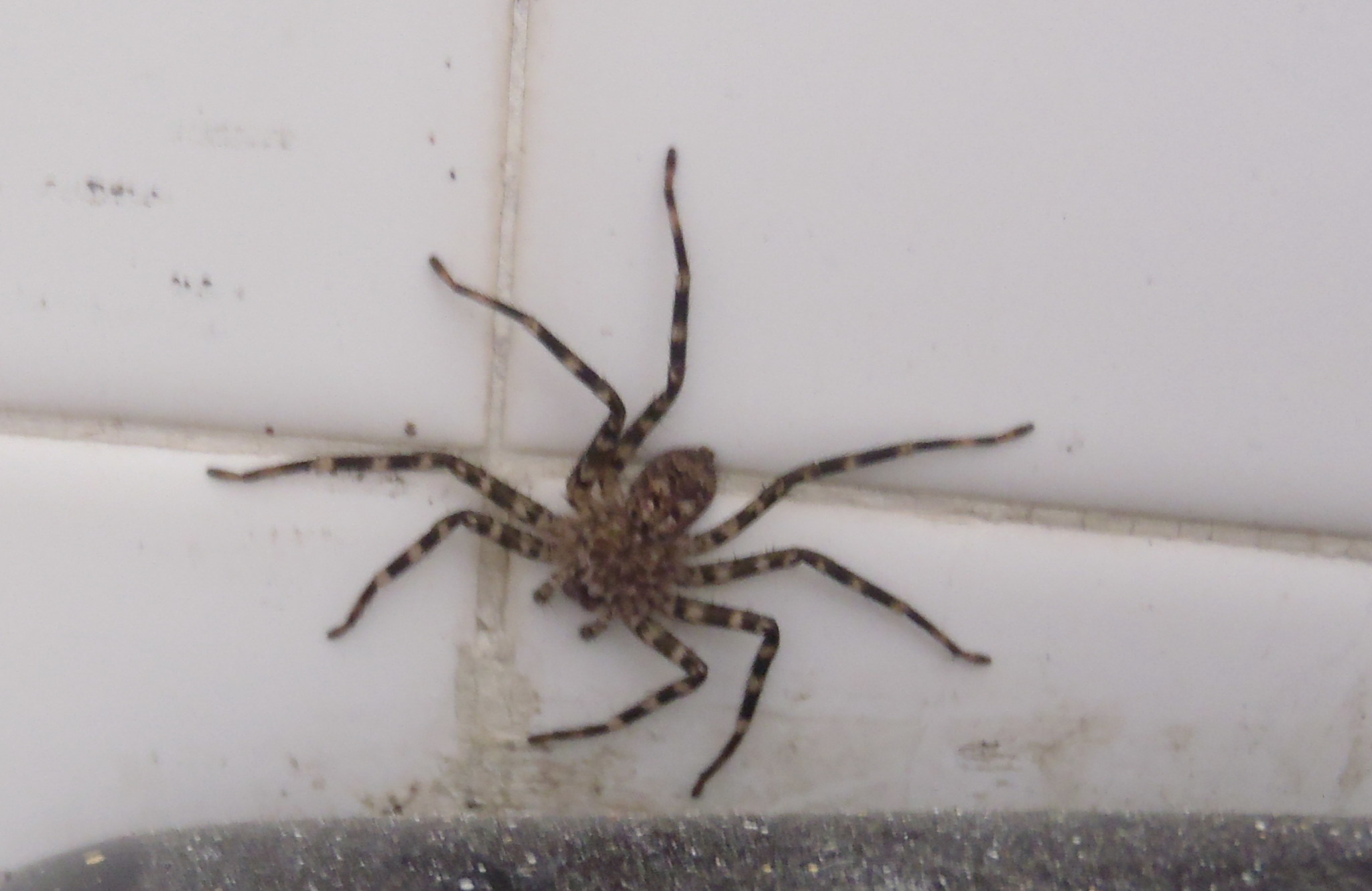

Scientific classification
- Kingdom: Animalia
- Phylum: Arthropoda
- Subphylum: Chelicerata
- Class: Arachnida
- Order: Araneae
- Infraorder: Araneomorphae
- Family: Selenopidae
- Genus: Anyphops
- Species: A. capensis

Binomial name
- Anyphops capensis (Lawrence, 1940)

= Anyphops capensis =

Cape Anyphops Flat Spider

Species of spider

Anyphops capensis is a species of spider in the family Selenopidae. It is endemic to South Africa and is commonly known as the Cape anyphops flat spider.

== Distribution ==
Anyphops capensis is found in South Africa. The species occurs in the Eastern Cape and Western Cape provinces, at altitudes ranging from 7 to 1513 m above sea level.

== Habitat and ecology ==
The species inhabits the Fynbos biome. These are free-living cryptozoic nocturnal spiders that have been collected from under bark in eucalyptus plantations and fynbos. They are also found in houses on walls.

== Description ==
The species is known from both sexes. The carapace is yellow-brown with darker radii from the thoracic striae, with the cephalic portion a little darker than the thoracic portion. The opisthosoma above is yellow-brown with small scattered blackish dots, darker towards the posterior apex, especially at the sides and just above the spinners. The dark dots on the posterior portion are characteristic.

The legs are not strongly banded, with tibiae having two light and two dark bands. Anterior tibiae have 6 pairs of inferior spines. Total length is 13-14 mm in females and 12-13 mm in males.

== Conservation ==
Anyphops capensis is listed as Least Concern due to the wide geographical range. There are no known threats to the species. It is protected in Mountain Zebra National Park, De Hoop Nature Reserve, and Table Mountain National Park.

== Taxonomy ==
The species was originally described by R. F. Lawrence in 1940 as Selenops capensis from Cape Town. It was transferred to the genus Anyphops by Benoit in 1968.
