= Anyphops narcissi =

Swaziland Anyphops Flat Spider

Conservation status
- Least Concern (SANBI Red List)

Scientific classification
- Kingdom: Animalia
- Phylum: Arthropoda
- Subphylum: Chelicerata
- Class: Arachnida
- Order: Araneae
- Infraorder: Araneomorphae
- Family: Selenopidae
- Genus: Anyphops
- Species: A. narcissi

Binomial name
- Anyphops narcissi Benoit, 1972

Species of spider

Anyphops narcissi is a species of spider in the family Selenopidae. It occurs in southern Africa and is commonly known as the Swaziland Anyphops flat spider.

== Distribution ==
Anyphops narcissi occurs in South Africa and Eswatini. In South Africa it has been recorded from Mpumalanga and KwaZulu-Natal provinces, including Mariepskop, Drakensberg Mountains, Sabie Bergvliet State Forest, Sappi Greystone Plantation near Barberton, and University of Zululand at Empangeni, at altitudes ranging from 78 to 1,382 m above sea level.

== Habitat and ecology ==
The species inhabits the Indian Ocean Coastal Belt and Grassland biomes and is a free-living cryptozoic nocturnal ground-dwelling spider. It has been sampled from pitfall traps in indigenous forest in state forests and plantations.

== Description ==
Only the female is known. The whole body and legs are pale yellow except for the eyes which appear as dark circles. The abdomen is yellow with a vague darker pattern on the distal half. Metatarsi I and II have three pairs of lower spines arranged in a front row of five and a posterior row of six spines. Total length is 6.3 mm.

== Conservation ==
Anyphops narcissi is listed as Least Concern. Although only known from one sex, the species is widespread across South Africa and Eswatini. It is protected in Sabie Bergvliet State Forest.
