= Anyphops maculosus =

Willowmore Anyphops Flat Spider

Conservation status
- Least Concern (SANBI Red List)

Scientific classification
- Kingdom: Animalia
- Phylum: Arthropoda
- Subphylum: Chelicerata
- Class: Arachnida
- Order: Araneae
- Infraorder: Araneomorphae
- Family: Selenopidae
- Genus: Anyphops
- Species: A. maculosus

Binomial name
- Anyphops maculosus (Lawrence, 1940)

Species of spider

Anyphops maculosus is a species of spider in the family Selenopidae. It is endemic to South Africa and is commonly known as the Willowmore Anyphops flat spider.

== Distribution ==
Anyphops maculosus occurs in three South African provinces: Eastern Cape, Northern Cape, and Western Cape. It has been recorded from Willowmore and Pearston in the Eastern Cape, Farm Gamesep near Postmasburg and Kathu in the Northern Cape, and Beaufort West and Karoo National Park in the Western Cape at altitudes ranging from 709 to 1,212 m above sea level.

== Habitat and ecology ==
The species inhabits the Nama Karoo and Thicket biomes and is a free-living cryptozoic nocturnal ground-dwelling spider.

== Description ==
Only the female is known. The carapace has well-defined radiations from the thoracic striae and crenulated submarginal bands, with a well-defined but narrow blackish marginal marking. The chelicerae are reddish brown with some darker markings.

The abdomen above is dirty yellow with some ill-defined brownish spots and numerous minute dots scattered over its surface. The legs have fairly well defined bands. The anterior tibiae have 5 pairs of inferior spines. Total length is 11 mm.

== Conservation ==
Anyphops maculosus is listed as Least Concern. Although the species is presently known only from one sex, it has a wide geographical range and is protected in Karoo National Park.
