= Anyphops parvulus =

Scientific classification
- Kingdom: Animalia
- Phylum: Arthropoda
- Subphylum: Chelicerata
- Class: Arachnida
- Order: Araneae
- Infraorder: Araneomorphae
- Family: Selenopidae
- Genus: Anyphops
- Species: A. parvulus

Binomial name
- Anyphops parvulus (Pocock, 1900)

Synonyms
- Selenops parvulus Pocock, 1900

Species of spider

Anyphops parvulus is a species of spider in the family Selenopidae. It is endemic to South Africa.

== Distribution ==
Anyphops parvulus is found in South Africa, specifically in the Eastern Cape and Western Cape provinces. The species is known from Port Elizabeth in the Eastern Cape and from Knysna and Kranshoek (20 km east of Knysna) in the Western Cape.

== Habitat and ecology ==
The species inhabits Forest and Thicket biomes at low altitudes ranging from 7 to 45 m above sea level. Anyphops parvulus are free-living cryptozoic nocturnal ground-dwelling spiders.

== Description ==
Anyphops parvulus is known only from the female. The carapace is orange-brown with lateral dark grey markings reaching the lateral edges, with a black external line. The chelicerae are orange-brown with a slight dark grey marking on the inner edge and a transversal spot at the tip. The legs are pale orange-brown with markings.

The dorsal surface of the abdomen is pale grey with dark grey spots, while the sides are dark grey and the posterior portion has a whitish transversal band. The anterior tibiae have 4 pairs of inferior spines. The total length is 7.07 mm.

== Conservation ==
Anyphops parvulus is listed as Data Deficient by the IUCN due to taxonomic uncertainty. The species has a very restricted range. The status of the species remains obscure, and additional sampling is needed to collect males and determine the species' true range. Threats to the species are unknown.

== Etymology ==
The species name parvulus is Latin meaning "very small", referring to the small size of this spider species.

== Taxonomy ==
The species was originally described by Reginald Innes Pocock in 1900 as Selenops parvulus from Port Elizabeth. It was transferred to the genus Anyphops by Benoit in 1968. The species was revised by Corronca in 2005.
