= Anyphops natalensis =

Scientific classification
- Kingdom: Animalia
- Phylum: Arthropoda
- Subphylum: Chelicerata
- Class: Arachnida
- Order: Araneae
- Infraorder: Araneomorphae
- Family: Selenopidae
- Genus: Anyphops
- Species: A. natalensis

Binomial name
- Anyphops natalensis (Lawrence, 1940)

Species of spider

Anyphops natalensis is a species of spider in the family Selenopidae. It is endemic to South Africa.

== Distribution ==
Anyphops natalensis is endemic to KwaZulu-Natal Province. It is known only from the type locality of Estcourt at an altitude of 1,189 m above sea level.

== Habitat and ecology ==
The species inhabits the Grassland biome and is a free-living cryptozoic nocturnal ground-dwelling spider.

== Description ==
Both sexes are known. The carapace is blackish brown at the sides with a median, more or less parallel, yellow marking as wide as the darkened area on each side. This lighter marking has crenulated sides and is constricted behind the thoracic stria, reaching from the ocular area to the posterior margin and containing a blackish median stripe with a pair of lateral branches.

The abdomen above is dark brown with a pair of long oval lighter markings on each side of the anterior half and a pair of smaller oval light spots above the spinnerets. The legs have anterior tibiae with 4 pairs of inferior spines, anterior metatarsi with 3 inferior pairs, and no lateral spines. The anterior tibiae are unusually short and stout. Total length is 8 mm.

== Conservation ==
Anyphops natalensis is listed as Data Deficient. The species is known only from the type locality and more sampling is needed to determine the species' range.

== Taxonomy ==
The species was revised by Corronca (2005).
