= Anyphops minor =

Empangeni Anyphops Wall Spider

Conservation status
- Least Concern (SANBI Red List)

Scientific classification
- Kingdom: Animalia
- Phylum: Arthropoda
- Subphylum: Chelicerata
- Class: Arachnida
- Order: Araneae
- Infraorder: Araneomorphae
- Family: Selenopidae
- Genus: Anyphops
- Species: A. minor

Binomial name
- Anyphops minor (Lawrence, 1940)

Species of spider

Anyphops minor is a species of spider in the family Selenopidae. It is endemic to South Africa and is commonly known as the Empangeni Anyphops wall spider.

== Distribution ==
Anyphops minor occurs in two South African provinces: KwaZulu-Natal and Western Cape. It has been recorded from Empangeni, iSimangaliso Wetland Park (Hell's Gate), and La Mercy in KwaZulu-Natal, and Diepwalle Forest Station and Groeneweide Forest Station near George in the Western Cape at altitudes ranging from 7 to 243 m above sea level.

== Habitat and ecology ==
The species inhabits the Forest, Indian Ocean Coastal Belt, and Savanna biomes and is a free-living cryptozoic nocturnal ground-dwelling spider. It has also been sampled from sugar cane fields.

== Description ==
Both sexes are known. The carapace is brown with a very broad blackish-brown marginal band, crenulated along its inner margin and including some light brown spots. The lighter inner portion of the carapace lacks distinct radiations from the thoracic stria and has a T-shaped blackish marking behind the eyes, with the cephalic region having a narrow blackish margin. The chelicerae are blackish brown.

The abdomen is blackish, variegated with a few symmetrically arranged lighter spots, including a large pair just anterior to the posterior margin, and some minute black spots at the sides of the under surface. The femora of the legs have only one complete well defined band in the middle, with the other two bands represented by blotches and spots. The anterior tibiae have 5 pairs of inferior spines. Total length is 7.6 mm.

== Conservation ==
Anyphops minor is listed as Least Concern. The species has a wide geographical range and is protected in Diepwalle Forest Station and Groeneweide Forest Station.
