= Anyphops hessei =

Hesse's Anyphops Flat Spider

Conservation status
- Least Concern (SANBI Red List)

Scientific classification
- Kingdom: Animalia
- Phylum: Arthropoda
- Subphylum: Chelicerata
- Class: Arachnida
- Order: Araneae
- Infraorder: Araneomorphae
- Family: Selenopidae
- Genus: Anyphops
- Species: A. hessei

Binomial name
- Anyphops hessei (Lawrence, 1940)

Species of spider

Anyphops hessei is a species of spider in the family Selenopidae. It is endemic to South Africa and is commonly known as Hesse's Anyphops flat spider.

== Distribution ==
Anyphops hessei occurs in three South African provinces: Free State, Western Cape, and Northern Cape. Notable localities include Matjiesfontein, Prince Albert, Karoo National Park, and Richtersveld National Park.

== Habitat and ecology ==
The species inhabits Fynbos, Desert, Grassland, and Succulent Karoo biomes at altitudes ranging from 250 to 1405 m above sea level. These are free-living cryptozoic nocturnal ground living spiders.

== Description ==
Known only from the female. The carapace is reddish brown with a fine blackish marginal border, with the cephalic region darker than the thoracic portion. The thoracic striae and its radiations are distinct, while the remaining markings are somewhat vague. The chelicerae are dark reddish brown.

The opisthosoma apparently has a number of blackish-brown spots near the spinnerets. The femora of the legs have ill-defined banded markings, those of the tibiae are more distinct, and the metatarsi are dark brown. The anterior tibiae have 5 pairs of inferior spines.

Total length is 13 mm.

== Conservation ==
Anyphops hessei is listed as Least Concern due to its wide geographical range. The species is protected in four protected areas: Anysberg Nature Reserve, Gamkaberg Nature Reserve, Karoo National Park, and Richtersveld National Park.

== Taxonomy ==
The species was originally described by Lawrence in 1940 as Selenops hessei from Matjiesfontein in the Western Cape. It was later transferred to the genus Anyphops by Benoit in 1968.
