= Anyphops longipedatus =

Scientific classification
- Kingdom: Animalia
- Phylum: Arthropoda
- Subphylum: Chelicerata
- Class: Arachnida
- Order: Araneae
- Infraorder: Araneomorphae
- Family: Selenopidae
- Genus: Anyphops
- Species: A. longipedatus

Binomial name
- Anyphops longipedatus (Roewer, 1955)

Synonyms
- Selenops longipes Lawrence, 1940

Species of spider

Anyphops longipedatus is a species of spider in the family Selenopidae. It is endemic to South Africa.

== Distribution ==
Anyphops longipedatus occurs in three South African provinces: Gauteng, KwaZulu-Natal, and North West. It has been recorded from Johannesburg and Kempton Park in Gauteng, Ladysmith and Natal Midlands in KwaZulu-Natal, and Skeerpoort in North West at altitudes ranging from 1,046 to 1,762 m above sea level.

== Habitat and ecology ==
The species inhabits the Grassland and Savanna biomes and is a free-living cryptozoic nocturnal ground-dwelling spider.

== Description ==
Only the female is known. Specimens are somewhat bleached in appearance. The carapace is light yellow brown with indistinct spots and mottling, with boundaries of the cephalic region and striae slightly darker and areas surrounding the eyes blackish. The chelicerae are not darker than the carapace.

The abdomen above has indistinct spots and mottling in the anterior half and two black bow-shaped transverse bars in the posterior half. The legs have indistinct blackish brown bands, with those at the bases of the anterior tibiae and femora well defined. The anterior tibiae have 5 pairs of inferior spines. Total length is 9.5 mm.

== Conservation ==
Anyphops longipedatus is listed as Data Deficient due to taxonomic reasons. More sampling is needed to collect males and determine the species' full range.

== Taxonomy ==
The species was originally described by Lawrence (1940) as Selenops longipes from Johannesburg in Gauteng. However, this name was preoccupied by Petrunkevitch (1930), and Roewer (1955) provided the replacement name longipedatus.
