= Anyphops whiteae =

White's Anyphops Flat Spider

Conservation status
- Least Concern (SANBI Red List)

Scientific classification
- Kingdom: Animalia
- Phylum: Arthropoda
- Subphylum: Chelicerata
- Class: Arachnida
- Order: Araneae
- Infraorder: Araneomorphae
- Family: Selenopidae
- Genus: Anyphops
- Species: A. whiteae

Binomial name
- Anyphops whiteae (Pocock, 1902)

Species of spider

Anyphops whiteae is a species of spider in the family Selenopidae. It is endemic to South Africa and is commonly known as White's Anyphops flat spider.

== Distribution ==
Anyphops whiteae is found in two provinces of South Africa: Eastern Cape and KwaZulu-Natal. Notable locations include Grahamstown, King William's Town, Port St. Johns, Pinetown near Durban, and Umkomaas.

== Habitat and ecology ==
The species inhabits multiple biomes including Forest, Savanna, and Thicket biomes at altitudes ranging from 5 to 607 m above sea level. These are free-living cryptozoic nocturnal ground living spiders.

== Description ==
Anyphops whiteae is known from only the female. The carapace is light yellow in the thoracic region, with a number of ill-defined darker lines radiating from the striae. The cephalic portion is darker, light reddish brown, bisected by a discontinuous median blackish stripe, and the ocular area is generally blackish brown. The chelicerae are yellow, blackish towards their apices.

The abdomen is brown with some darker broad chevron markings. The femora have blotched markings, tibiae have ill-defined brown bands, and metatarsi have strong blackish bands with a black band at apex and base and yellow between them. Total length is 13.7 mm.

== Conservation ==
Anyphops whiteae is listed as Least Concern by the South African National Biodiversity Institute, as much natural habitat remains within its range and it is likely to be undersampled.

== Taxonomy ==
The species was originally described by Reginald Innes Pocock in 1902 as Selenops whiteae from Brak Kloof, Grahamstown. Lawrence (1940) described the female, and it was later transferred to the genus Anyphops by Benoit in 1968. The species was last revised by Benoit in 1968.
