= Anyphops basutus =

Lesotho Anyphops Flat Spider

Conservation status
- Least Concern (SANBI Red List)

Scientific classification
- Kingdom: Animalia
- Phylum: Arthropoda
- Subphylum: Chelicerata
- Class: Arachnida
- Order: Araneae
- Infraorder: Araneomorphae
- Family: Selenopidae
- Genus: Anyphops
- Species: A. basutus

Binomial name
- Anyphops basutus (Pocock, 1901)

Species of spider

Anyphops basutus is a species of spider in the family Selenopidae. It occurs in southern Africa and is commonly known as the Lesotho Anyphops flat spider.

== Distribution ==
Anyphops basutus is found in Lesotho and South Africa. In South Africa, the species occurs in the Eastern Cape and KwaZulu-Natal provinces, at altitudes ranging from 375 to 1690 m above sea level.

== Habitat and ecology ==
The species inhabits Forest and Indian Ocean Coastal Belt biomes. These are free-living cryptozoic nocturnal ground dwellers.

== Description ==
The species is known only from females. It resembles A. atomarius and A. spenceri in having seven pairs of tibial spines on leg I and II. Total length is 18 mm.

== Conservation ==
Anyphops basutus is listed as Least Concern due to its wide geographical range. There are no known threats to the species. It is protected in Vernon Crookes Nature Reserve. More sampling is needed to determine the range.

== Taxonomy ==
The species was originally described by Reginald Innes Pocock in 1901 as Selenops basutus from Lesotho. It was transferred to the genus Anyphops by Benoit in 1968.
