= Anyphops karrooicus =

Karoo's Anyphops Flat Spider

Conservation status
- Least Concern (SANBI Red List)

Scientific classification
- Kingdom: Animalia
- Phylum: Arthropoda
- Subphylum: Chelicerata
- Class: Arachnida
- Order: Araneae
- Infraorder: Araneomorphae
- Family: Selenopidae
- Genus: Anyphops
- Species: A. karrooicus

Binomial name
- Anyphops karrooicus (Lawrence, 1940)

Species of spider

Anyphops karrooicus is a species of spider in the family Selenopidae. It is endemic to South Africa and is commonly known as Karoo's Anyphops flat spider.

== Distribution ==
Anyphops karrooicus occurs in three South African provinces: Eastern Cape, Free State, and Northern Cape. Notable localities include Hanover, Qwa Qwa National Park, and Grootfontein Research Station near Middelburg.

== Habitat and ecology ==
The species inhabits Grassland, Nama Karoo, and Savanna biomes at altitudes ranging from 1259 to 1680 m above sea level. These are free-living cryptozoic nocturnal ground living spiders that are found under stones.

== Description ==
Known from both sexes. The carapace is light reddish brown with sides narrowly bordered with black, the ocular area blackish, and the thoracic portion with irregular stripes and spots. The radii from the thoracic striae are blackish but incomplete, and the cephalic region is bordered by narrow blackish lines and bisected by a narrow line. The chelicerae are reddish brown.

The opisthosoma is dull white or yellow dorsally with symmetrical light-brown markings in the middle line and a darker transverse marking just above the spinnerets. The legs are yellow and strongly banded with black except on their ventral surfaces, with femora having 3 black bands, patellae with 1 basal band, and tibiae with 2 bands.

Total length is 9-17 mm.

== Conservation ==
Anyphops karrooicus is listed as Least Concern due to its wide geographical range. The species receives protection in Qwa Qwa National Park, which is now part of Golden Gate Highlands National Park.

== Taxonomy ==
The species was originally described by Lawrence in 1940 as Selenops karrooicus from Hanover. It was later transferred to the genus Anyphops by Benoit in 1968.
