= Anyphops lignicola =

Hluhluwe Anyphops Flat Spider

Conservation status
- Least Concern (SANBI Red List)

Scientific classification
- Kingdom: Animalia
- Phylum: Arthropoda
- Subphylum: Chelicerata
- Class: Arachnida
- Order: Araneae
- Infraorder: Araneomorphae
- Family: Selenopidae
- Genus: Anyphops
- Species: A. lignicola

Binomial name
- Anyphops lignicola (Lawrence, 1937)

Species of spider

Anyphops lignicola is a species of spider in the family Selenopidae. It is endemic to South Africa and is commonly known as Hluhluwe Anyphops flat spider.

== Distribution ==
Anyphops lignicola occurs in two South African provinces: KwaZulu-Natal and Mpumalanga. Notable localities include Hluhluwe-iMfolozi Park, uMkhuze Game Reserve, and Kruger National Park.

== Habitat and ecology ==
The species inhabits the Savanna biome at altitudes ranging from 83 to 1345 m above sea level. These are free-living cryptozoic nocturnal ground living spiders that are frequently sampled from pitfall traps.

== Description ==
The carapace is brown with a V-shaped blackish marking behind the eyes, infuscated eyes, and a dark spot behind the posterior lateral eyes. There is a dark median stripe on the cephalic region, and the thoracic portion of the carapace has a dark marginal and submarginal band, with the latter incomplete.

The opisthosoma is mottled above and mostly dark with an indistinct median tree-like marking.

The legs are yellow with strongly contrasting irregular black bands, especially on the anterior pairs, with patellae blackened in their basal halves, tibiae with 2 distinct black bands, and metatarsi with 2 black, less distinct bands with the distal one at the apex of the segment. The femora below are yellow while the remaining legs are faintly banded below, and the tibiae and tarsus of the palp have a distinct black basal band. Tibiae I and II have 5 pairs and metatarsi I and II have 3 pairs of strong inferior spines.

Total length is 10.4 mm.

== Conservation ==
Anyphops lignicola is listed as Least Concern due to having extensive habitat in protected areas. The species is protected in Hluhluwe-iMfolozi Park, uMkhuze Game Reserve, and Kruger National Park.

== Taxonomy ==
The species was originally described by Lawrence in 1937 as Selenops lignicolus from Hluhluwe Nature Reserve in KwaZulu-Natal. It was later transferred to the genus Anyphops by Benoit in 1968.
