= Anyphops civicus =

Burgersdorp Anyphops Flat Spider

Conservation status
- Least Concern (SANBI Red List)

Scientific classification
- Kingdom: Animalia
- Phylum: Arthropoda
- Subphylum: Chelicerata
- Class: Arachnida
- Order: Araneae
- Infraorder: Araneomorphae
- Family: Selenopidae
- Genus: Anyphops
- Species: A. civicus

Binomial name
- Anyphops civicus (Lawrence, 1940)

Species of spider

Anyphops civicus is a species of spider in the family Selenopidae. It is endemic to South Africa and is commonly known as the Burgersdorp anyphops flat spider.

== Distribution ==
Anyphops civicus is found in South Africa. The species occurs in the Eastern Cape, Free State, and KwaZulu-Natal provinces, at altitudes ranging from 291 to 1417 m above sea level.

== Habitat and ecology ==
The species inhabits Grassland, Nama Karoo, and Savanna biomes. These are free-living cryptozoic nocturnal spiders.

== Description ==
The species is known from both sexes. The markings of the carapace form a fairly well-defined crenulated submarginal band, with sides having a narrow blackish margin and between this and the submarginal band some blackish-brown spots. The foveal radiations are indistinct.

The legs have markings similar to A. karrooicus. The opisthosoma above has some indistinct brown markings on the posterior half, including some indistinct A-shaped markings. Anterior tibiae have 5 pairs of inferior spines. Total length is 7-12.5 mm.

== Conservation ==
Anyphops civicus is listed as Least Concern due to its wide geographical range. There are no known threats to the species. It is protected in Ngome State Forest.

== Taxonomy ==
The species was originally described by R. F. Lawrence in 1940 as Selenops civicus from Burghersdorp in the Eastern Cape. It was transferred to the genus Anyphops by Benoit in 1968.
