= Anyphops kraussi =

Conservation status
- Least Concern (IUCN 3.1)

Scientific classification
- Kingdom: Animalia
- Phylum: Arthropoda
- Subphylum: Chelicerata
- Class: Arachnida
- Order: Araneae
- Infraorder: Araneomorphae
- Family: Selenopidae
- Genus: Anyphops
- Species: A. kraussi

Binomial name
- Anyphops kraussi (Pocock, 1898)

Species of spider

Anyphops kraussi is a species of spider in the family Selenopidae. It is endemic to South Africa and is commonly known as Krauss' Anyphops flat spider.

== Distribution ==
Anyphops kraussi is endemic to the Western Cape province of South Africa. The species occurs in Table Mountain National Park and Bontebok National Park.

== Habitat and ecology ==
The species inhabits indigenous forest areas in the Fynbos biome at altitudes ranging from 7 to 292 m above sea level. These are free-living cryptozoic nocturnal ground living spiders.

== Description ==
Known only from the female. The species resembles Selenops radiatus in size and colour, with legs that are strongly banded. The species has 6 pairs of inferior tibial spines.

== Conservation ==
Anyphops kraussi is listed as Rare due to its small area of occupancy and being known from only one sex. The species is protected in Table Mountain National Park but more sampling is needed.

== Taxonomy ==
The species was originally described by Pocock in 1898 as Selenops kraussii with the type locality given only as Cape Colony. It was later transferred to the genus Anyphops by Benoit in 1968.
