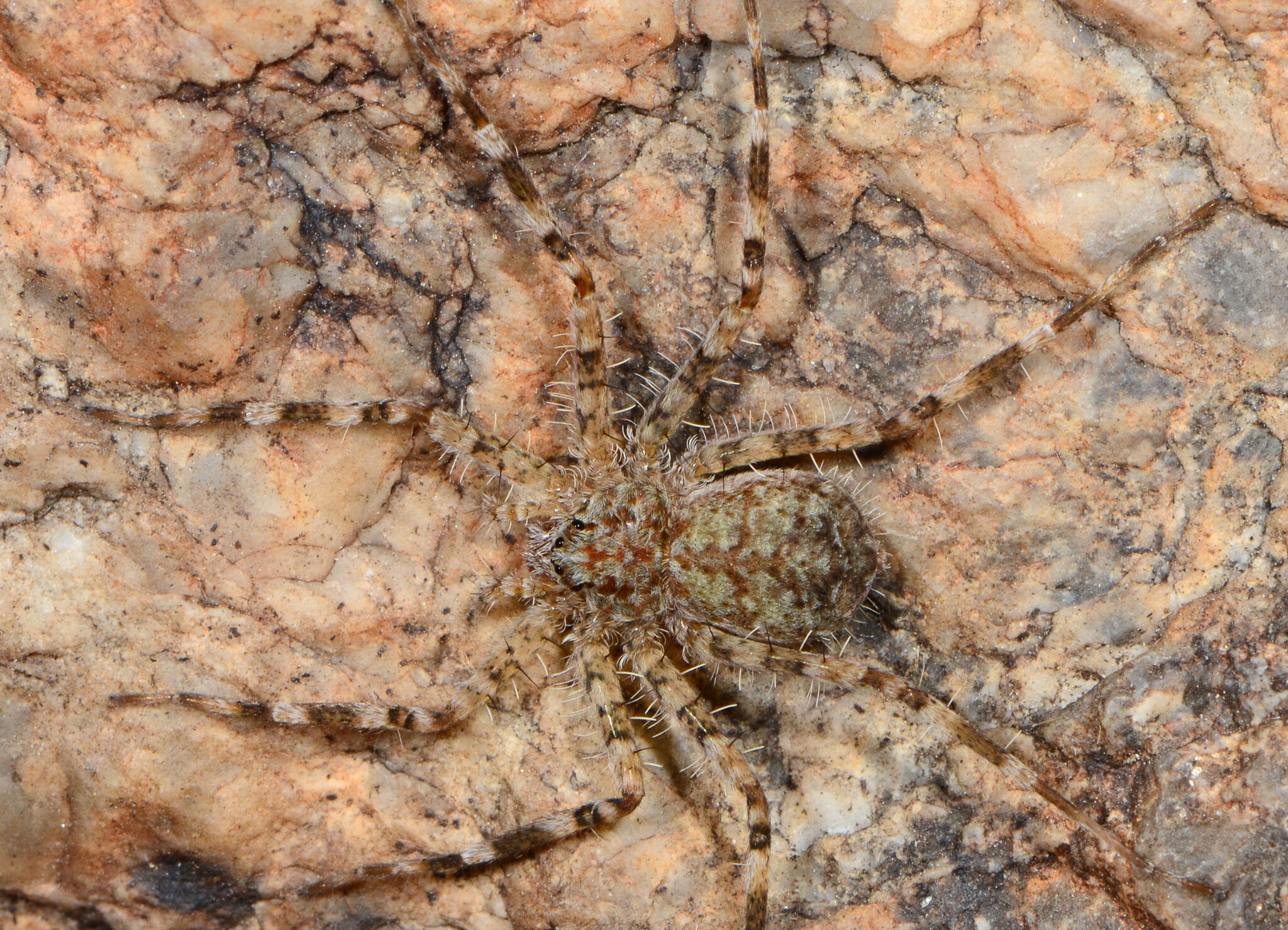
- Female
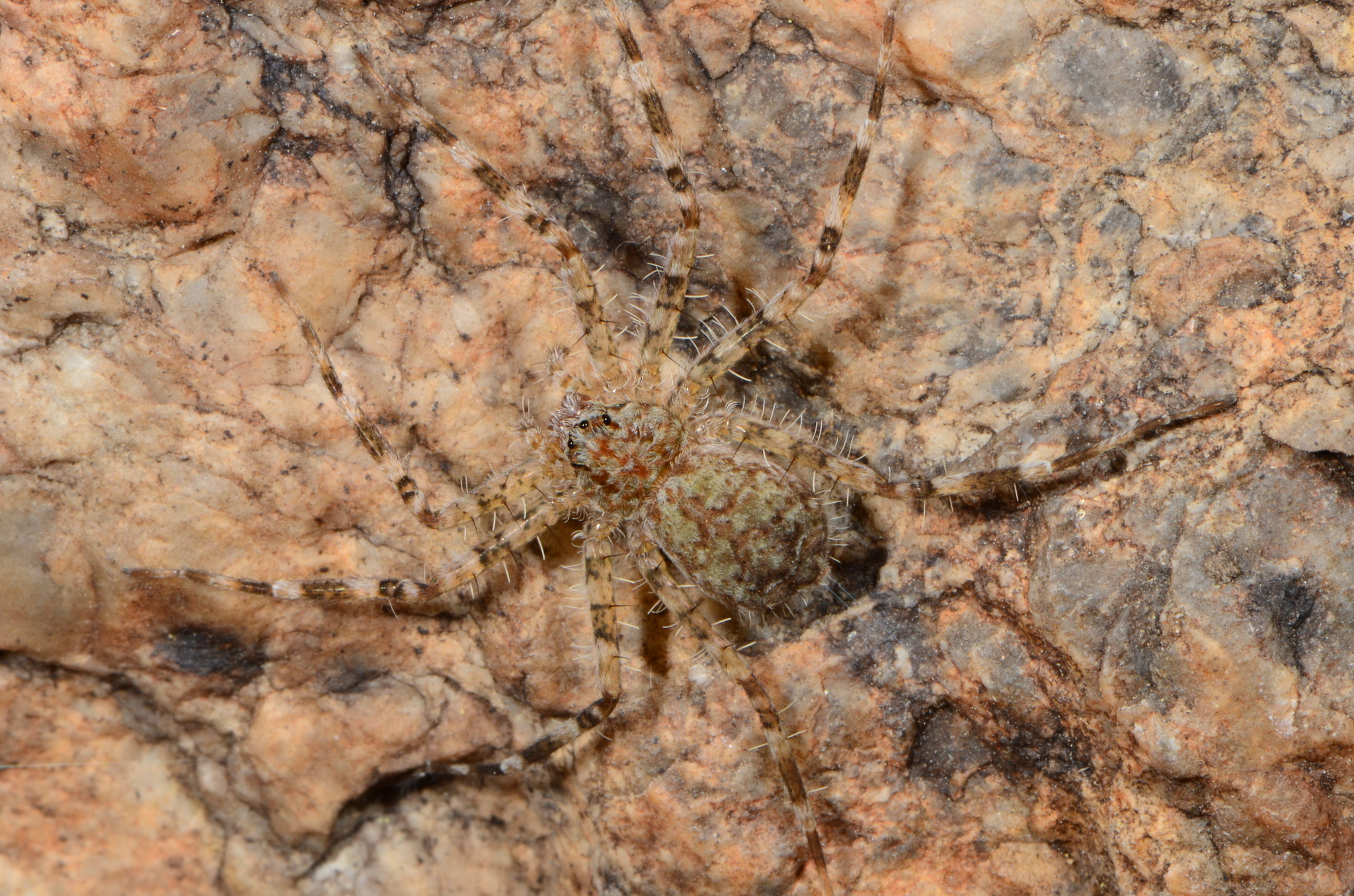
- Female

Scientific classification
- Kingdom: Animalia
- Phylum: Arthropoda
- Subphylum: Chelicerata
- Class: Arachnida
- Order: Araneae
- Infraorder: Araneomorphae
- Family: Selenopidae
- Genus: Anyphops
- Species: A. marshalli

Binomial name
- Anyphops marshalli (Pocock, 1902)

= Anyphops marshalli =

Estcourt Anyphops Flat Spider

Species of spider

Anyphops marshalli is a species of spider in the family Selenopidae. It is endemic to South Africa and is commonly known as the Estcourt Anyphops flat spider.

== Distribution ==
Anyphops marshalli occurs in the South African provinces Eastern Cape, KwaZulu-Natal, and Western Cape. It has been recorded from Grahamstown, East London Pineapple Research Station, and Port Alfred in the Eastern Cape; Durban, Estcourt, Pinetown, and Kloof in KwaZulu-Natal; and Diepwalle Forest Station in the Western Cape at altitudes ranging from 17 to 1,189 m above sea level.

== Habitat and ecology ==
The species inhabits the Grassland, Indian Ocean Coastal Belt, and Savanna biomes and is a free-living cryptozoic nocturnal ground-dwelling spider. It has also been sampled from houses.

== Description ==
Only the male is described. The integument is ochre-brown, covered with a mixture of golden-yellow and blackish hairs. The legs have blackish bands. The anterior tibiae have 7 pairs of inferior spines. Total length is 11 mm.

== Conservation ==
Anyphops marshalli is listed as Least Concern. Although the species is presently known only from one sex, it has a wide geographical range and is protected in Diepwalle Forest Station.
