= Anyphops lycosiformis =

Nkandla Anyphops Flat Spider

Conservation status
- Least Concern (SANBI Red List)

Scientific classification
- Kingdom: Animalia
- Phylum: Arthropoda
- Subphylum: Chelicerata
- Class: Arachnida
- Order: Araneae
- Infraorder: Araneomorphae
- Family: Selenopidae
- Genus: Anyphops
- Species: A. lycosiformis

Binomial name
- Anyphops lycosiformis (Lawrence, 1937)

Species of spider

Anyphops lycosiformis is a species of spider in the family Selenopidae. It is endemic to South Africa and is commonly known as the Nkandla Anyphops flat spider.

== Distribution ==
Anyphops lycosiformis occurs in two South African provinces: KwaZulu-Natal and Limpopo. It has been recorded from Ngome State Forest and Nkandla Forest in KwaZulu-Natal, and Lekgalameetse Nature Reserve in Limpopo at altitudes ranging from 687 to 1,129 m above sea level.

== Habitat and ecology ==
The species inhabits the Forest and Savanna biomes and is a free-living cryptozoic nocturnal ground-dwelling spider.

== Description ==
Only the female is known. The carapace is orange-brown with a light middle central area. The chelicerae are orange-brown with dark marking in the distal portion. The legs are pale orange-yellow with markings consisting of three incomplete rings on the femora and two on the tibiae, while the metatarsi and tarsi are pale yellowish.

The dorsum of the abdomen is pale brown with a light yellowish central area, and the venter is light yellow. The anterior tibiae have 4 pairs of inferior spines. Total length is 7.70 mm.

== Conservation ==
Anyphops lycosiformis is listed as Least Concern. Although only known from one sex, the species has a wide distribution and occurs in protected areas where it is not threatened.

== Taxonomy ==
The species was originally described by Lawrence (1937) as Selenops lycosiformis from Nkandla Forest in KwaZulu-Natal. It was revised by Corronca (2005).
