= Anyphops mumai =

Scientific classification
- Kingdom: Animalia
- Phylum: Arthropoda
- Subphylum: Chelicerata
- Class: Arachnida
- Order: Araneae
- Infraorder: Araneomorphae
- Family: Selenopidae
- Genus: Anyphops
- Species: A. mumai

Binomial name
- Anyphops mumai (Corronca, 1996)

Synonyms
- Selenops minutus Lawrence, 1940

Species of spider

Anyphops mumai is a species of spider in the family Selenopidae. It is endemic to South Africa.

== Distribution ==
Anyphops mumai is endemic to the Eastern Cape Province. It has been recorded from Fort Brown Kudu Reserve (Farm Hermanuskraal) and Grahamstown at altitudes ranging from 281 to 565 m above sea level.

== Habitat and ecology ==
The species inhabits the Thicket biome and is a free-living cryptozoic nocturnal ground-dwelling spider. In the Kudu Reserve it was sampled from pitfall traps.

== Description ==
Only the male is known. The carapace is reddish brown with some submarginal markings and thoracic stria continued as a Y-shaped marking. The cephalic region is divided by a very faint narrow blackish stripe, and eyes are surrounded by blackened areas. The chelicerae are reddish brown.

The abdomen is light brown with a broad, sharply defined, procurved band above the spinnerets. This transverse band is whitish and contrasts strongly with the remainder of the abdomen. Tibiae I and II have 5 pairs, and metatarsi I and II have 3 pairs of inferior spines with no lateral spines. Total length is 5.2 mm.

== Conservation ==
Anyphops mumai is listed as Data Deficient due to taxonomic reasons. The species is only known from localities last sampled in 1991, and more sampling is needed to collect females and determine the species' range. It is protected in Fort Brown Kudu Reserve.

== Taxonomy ==
The species was originally described by Lawrence (1940) as Selenops minutus from Grahamstown. However, this name was a primary junior homonym of Selenops minutus F. O. Pickard-Cambridge, 1900, and Corronca (1996) provided the replacement name mumai.
