= Anyphops leleupi =

Leleup's Anyphops Flat Spider

Conservation status
- Least Concern (SANBI Red List)

Scientific classification
- Kingdom: Animalia
- Phylum: Arthropoda
- Subphylum: Chelicerata
- Class: Arachnida
- Order: Araneae
- Infraorder: Araneomorphae
- Family: Selenopidae
- Genus: Anyphops
- Species: A. leleupi

Binomial name
- Anyphops leleupi Benoit, 1972

Species of spider

Anyphops leleupi is a species of spider in the family Selenopidae. It is endemic to South Africa and is commonly known as Leleup's Anyphops flat spider.

== Distribution ==
Anyphops leleupi occurs in two South African provinces: Limpopo and Mpumalanga. Notable localities include Mariepskop, Lekgalameetse Nature Reserve, Wolkberg Wilderness Area, and Blouberg Nature Reserve.

== Habitat and ecology ==
The species inhabits the Savanna biome at altitudes ranging from 762 to 1407 m above sea level. These are free-living cryptozoic nocturnal spiders that have been sampled from tree bark.

== Description ==
Known only from the female. The anterior tibiae have 6 pairs of inferior spines. Total length is 9.5 mm.

== Conservation ==
Anyphops leleupi is listed as Least Concern due to its wide geographical range. The species is protected in multiple reserves including Lekgalameetse Nature Reserve, Lhuvhondo Nature Reserve, Blouberg Nature Reserve, and Hanglip Forest Reserve.

== Taxonomy ==
The species was described by Benoit in 1972 from Mariepskop in Mpumalanga.
