= Selenops kruegeri =

Krugerpark Selenops Flat Spider

Conservation status
- Least Concern (SANBI Red List)

Scientific classification
- Kingdom: Animalia
- Phylum: Arthropoda
- Subphylum: Chelicerata
- Class: Arachnida
- Order: Araneae
- Infraorder: Araneomorphae
- Family: Selenopidae
- Genus: Selenops
- Species: S. kruegeri

Binomial name
- Selenops kruegeri Lawrence, 1940

Species of spider

Selenops kruegeri is a species of spider in the family Selenopidae. It is found in Nigeria, Angola, Zambia, Namibia, Botswana, Zimbabwe and South Africa and is commonly known as the Krugerpark Selenops flat spider.

== Distribution ==
Selenops kruegeri is found in Nigeria, Angola, Zambia, Namibia, Botswana, Zimbabwe and South Africa. In South Africa, it occurs in Gauteng, Limpopo, Mpumalanga and Northern Cape provinces at altitudes ranging from 418 to 1,415 m above sea level.

== Habitat and ecology ==
The species inhabits the Grassland and Savanna biomes and is a free-living cryptozoic nocturnal ground living spider.

== Description ==
Known only from the female, which can be distinguished from related species by the shape of the epigynal pockets and the shape of the spermathecae. S. kruegeri is easily separated from S. radiatus by the color pattern of the opisthosoma. Total length 12-13 mm.

== Conservation ==
Selenops kruegeri is listed as Least Concern by the South African National Biodiversity Institute due to its wide geographical range. The species is protected in Sabie Reserve and Kruger National Park.

== Taxonomy ==
The species was originally described by Lawrence in 1940 from Sabie Reserve in Mpumalanga. It was last revised by Corronca in 2002.
