= Anyphops ngome =

Ngome Anyphops Flat Spider

Conservation status
- Least Concern (SANBI Red List)

Scientific classification
- Kingdom: Animalia
- Phylum: Arthropoda
- Subphylum: Chelicerata
- Class: Arachnida
- Order: Araneae
- Infraorder: Araneomorphae
- Family: Selenopidae
- Genus: Anyphops
- Species: A. ngome

Binomial name
- Anyphops ngome Corronca, 2005

Species of spider

Anyphops ngome is a species of spider in the family Selenopidae. It is endemic to South Africa and is commonly known as the Ngome Anyphops flat spider.

== Distribution ==
Anyphops ngome occurs in two South African provinces: KwaZulu-Natal and Limpopo. It has been recorded from Ithala Nature Reserve and Ngome State Forest in KwaZulu-Natal, and Vhembe Biosphere Hanglip State Forest in Limpopo at altitudes ranging from 839 to 1,558 m above sea level.

== Habitat and ecology ==
The species inhabits the Savanna biome and is a free-living cryptozoic nocturnal ground-dwelling spider. It has been sampled from the ground in both open and closed forests.

== Description ==
Both sexes are known. The carapace is light orange-brown with lateral dark grey markings reaching the lateral edges. The chelicerae are orange-brown with a slight light grey marking. The legs are orange-brown without markings.

The dorsum of the abdomen has a whitish, large, sub-rectangular marking on the anterior and middle portion of the abdomen, with laterals dark brown containing yellowish spots. The venter is light yellow-grey. The anterior tibiae have 4 pairs of inferior spines. Total length is 5.56 mm.

== Conservation ==
Anyphops ngome is listed as Least Concern. The species is currently only known from protected areas where it is not declining. It is protected in two State Forests and Ithala Nature Reserve.
