= Anyphops lesserti =

Scientific classification
- Kingdom: Animalia
- Phylum: Arthropoda
- Subphylum: Chelicerata
- Class: Arachnida
- Order: Araneae
- Infraorder: Araneomorphae
- Family: Selenopidae
- Genus: Anyphops
- Species: A. lesserti

Binomial name
- Anyphops lesserti (Lawrence, 1940)

Species of spider

Anyphops lesserti is a species of spider in the family Selenopidae. It is endemic to South Africa.

== Distribution ==
Anyphops lesserti is endemic to the Western Cape province of South Africa. The species is known from a few localities including Touws River, Gouritsmond, and Swartberg Nature Reserve.

== Habitat and ecology ==
The species inhabits the Fynbos biome at altitudes ranging from sea level to 1405 m above sea level. These are free-living cryptozoic nocturnal ground living spiders.

== Description ==
Known only from the male. The carapace is orange-yellow with the thoracic striae visible, and the chelicerae are much darker than the carapace, being reddish brown.

The opisthosoma is light yellow-brown above with minute scattered black dots and a wavy transverse black stripe above the spinnerets. The legs apparently lack markings or bands of any kind. The anterior tibiae have 5 pairs of inferior spines.

Total length is 10.2 mm.

== Conservation ==
Anyphops lesserti is listed as Data Deficient due to taxonomic reasons. The species has a small range and more sampling is needed to collect females and determine the full extent of its distribution. It receives some protection in Swartberg Nature Reserve.

== Taxonomy ==
The species was originally described by Lawrence in 1940 as Selenops lesserti from Touws River. It was later transferred to the genus Anyphops by Benoit in 1968.
