= Anyphops montanus =

Scientific classification
- Kingdom: Animalia
- Phylum: Arthropoda
- Subphylum: Chelicerata
- Class: Arachnida
- Order: Araneae
- Infraorder: Araneomorphae
- Family: Selenopidae
- Genus: Anyphops
- Species: A. montanus

Binomial name
- Anyphops montanus (Lawrence, 1940)

Species of spider

Anyphops montanus is a species of spider in the family Selenopidae. It is endemic to South Africa.

== Distribution ==
Anyphops montanus is endemic to the Western Cape Province. It has been recorded from Clanwilliam, Matroosberg, Great Winterhoek Mountains, and Hermanus at altitudes ranging from 78 to 980 m above sea level.

== Habitat and ecology ==
The species inhabits the Fynbos and Nama Karoo biomes and is a free-living cryptozoic nocturnal ground-dwelling spider.

== Description ==
Only the female is known. The carapace is light reddish brown with distinct radii from the thoracic stria, one of these passing straight forwards and terminating behind the median eyes. Areas surrounding the eyes are blackish.

The abdomen above has numerous minute brown dots forming chevrons, becoming more numerous posteriorly, and is otherwise uniformly light yellow. The legs have black bands on tibiae. Tibiae I and II have 6 pairs of extremely long and strong inferior spines, and metatarsi I and II have 3 similar pairs of spines. Total length is 14.5 mm.

== Conservation ==
Anyphops montanus is listed as Data Deficient due to taxonomic reasons. The species is known from a few localities all sampled prior to 1940, and more sampling is needed to collect males and determine the species' current range.
