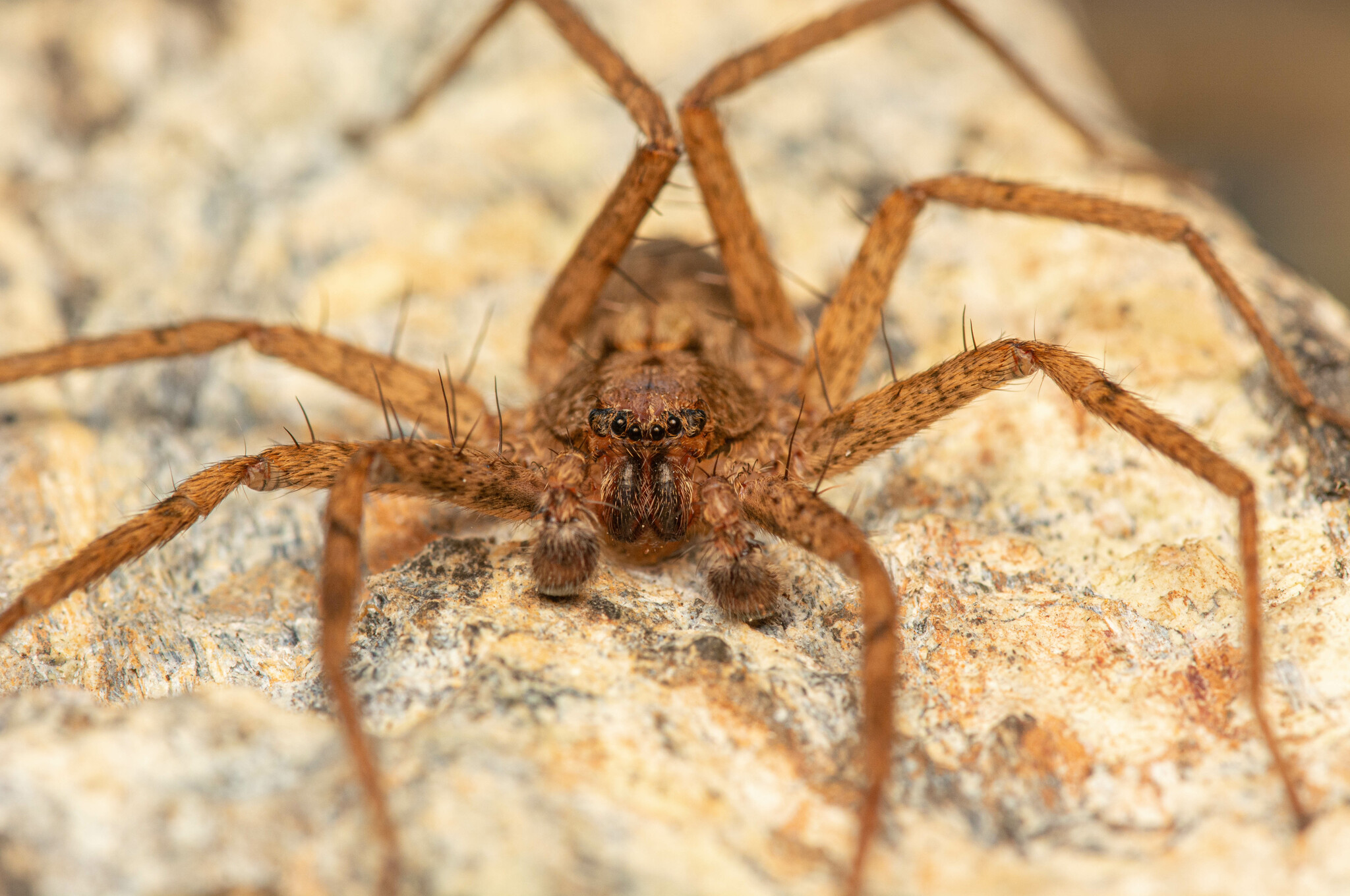
- male
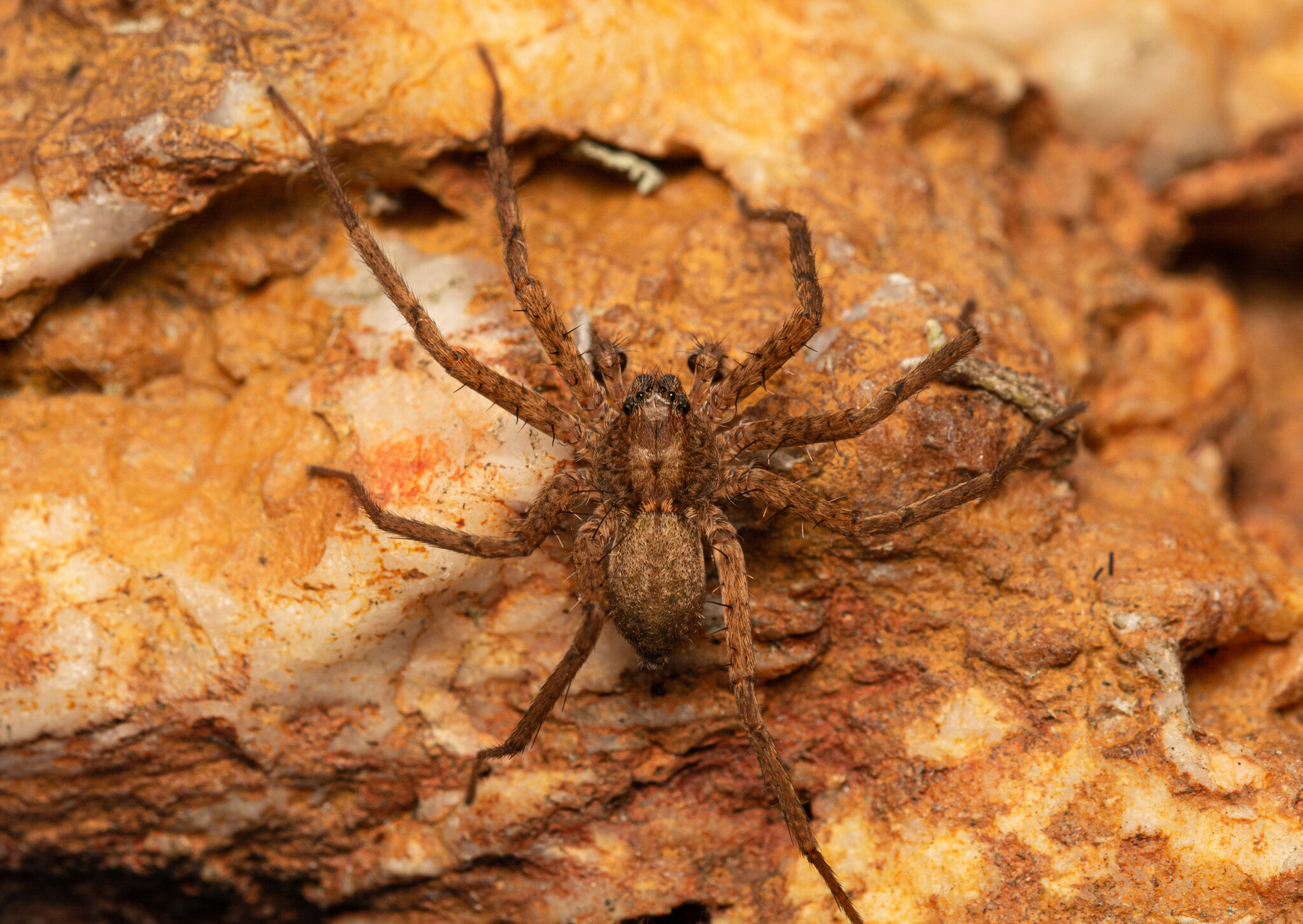
- male

Scientific classification
- Kingdom: Animalia
- Phylum: Arthropoda
- Subphylum: Chelicerata
- Class: Arachnida
- Order: Araneae
- Infraorder: Araneomorphae
- Family: Selenopidae
- Genus: Anyphops
- Species: A. immaculatus

Binomial name
- Anyphops immaculatus (Lawrence, 1940)

= Anyphops immaculatus =

Gauteng's Anyphops Flat Spider

Species of spider

Anyphops immaculatus is a species of spider in the family Selenopidae. It is endemic to South Africa and is commonly known as Gauteng's Anyphops flat spider.

== Distribution ==
Anyphops immaculatus occurs in five South African provinces: Free State, Gauteng, Eastern Cape, KwaZulu-Natal, and Western Cape. Notable localities include Florida, Pretoria, Bloemfontein, East London, and Cathedral Peak.

== Habitat and ecology ==
The species inhabits Fynbos, Grassland, and Thicket biomes at altitudes ranging from 52 to 1693 m above sea level. These are free-living cryptozoic nocturnal ground living spiders that are sometimes found in houses.

== Description ==
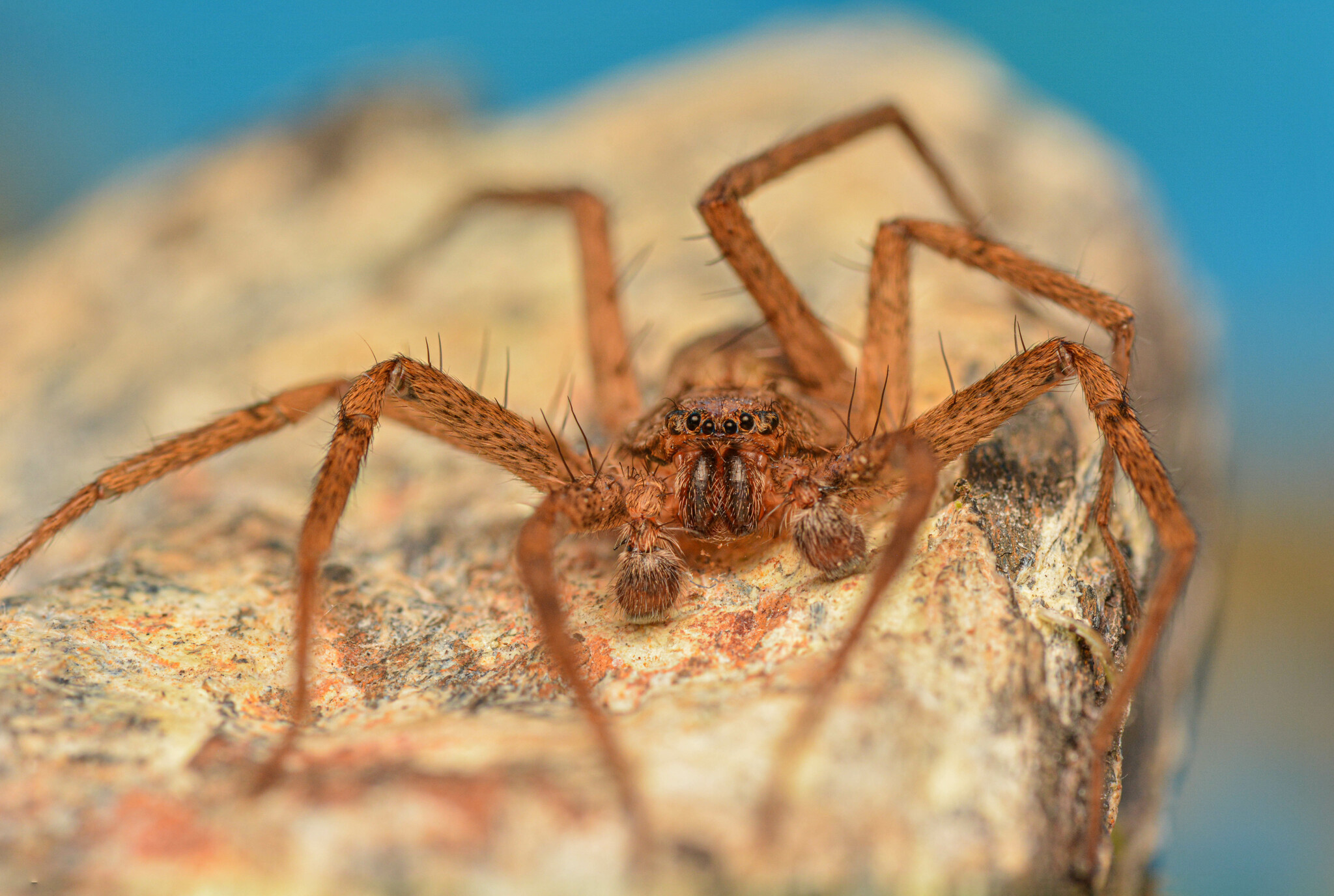
male

Known only from the male. The carapace is yellow-brown with thoracic striae and some very faint radiations from it a little darker, and eyes surrounded by a blackened area. The chelicerae are yellow brown.

The opisthosoma is yellow with a few blackish brown spots. The legs are without markings except for two very faint brown bands on the anterior tibiae. The anterior tibiae have 5 pairs of inferior spines.

Total length is 8.5 mm.

== Conservation ==
Anyphops immaculatus is listed as Least Concern due to its wide geographical range. The species is protected in the Swartberg Nature Reserve and Amanzi Private Game Reserve.

== Taxonomy ==
The species was originally described by Lawrence in 1940 as Selenops immaculatus from Florida in Gauteng. It was later transferred to the genus Anyphops by Benoit in 1968.
