= Godumops =

Scientific classification
- Kingdom: Animalia
- Phylum: Arthropoda
- Subphylum: Chelicerata
- Class: Arachnida
- Order: Araneae
- Infraorder: Araneomorphae
- Family: Selenopidae
- Genus: Godumops; Crews & Harvey, 2011
- Species: G. caritus

Binomial name
- Godumops caritus Crews & Harvey, 2011

Genus of spiders

Godumops is a monotypic genus of Papuan wall spiders containing the single species, Godumops caritus. It was first described by S. C. Crews & Mark Stephen Harvey in 2011, and is found in Papua New Guinea.
