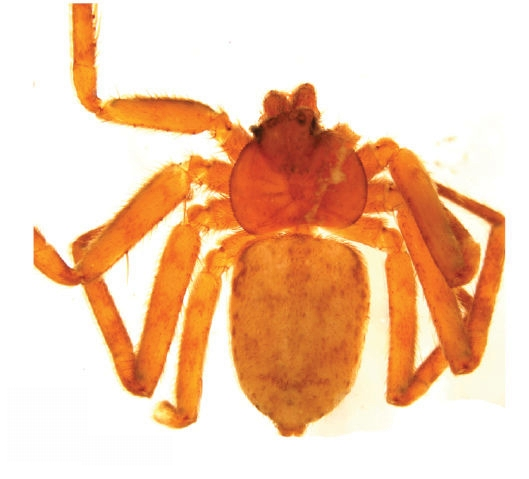
- Amamanganops baginawa, preserved specimen

Scientific classification
- Kingdom: Animalia
- Phylum: Arthropoda
- Subphylum: Chelicerata
- Class: Arachnida
- Order: Araneae
- Infraorder: Araneomorphae
- Family: Selenopidae
- Genus: Amamanganops; Crews & Harvey, 2011
- Species: A. baginawa

Binomial name
- Amamanganops baginawa Crews & Harvey, 2011

= Amamanganops =

Genus of spiders

Amamanganops is a monotypic genus of Filipino wall spiders containing the single species, Amamanganops baginawa. It was first described by S. C. Crews & Mark Stephen Harvey in 2011, and is found in the Philippines.
