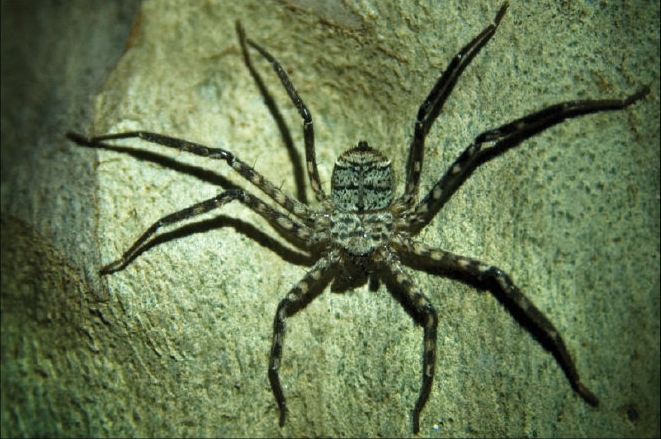
- K. raveni

Scientific classification
- Kingdom: Animalia
- Phylum: Arthropoda
- Subphylum: Chelicerata
- Class: Arachnida
- Order: Araneae
- Infraorder: Araneomorphae
- Family: Selenopidae
- Genus: Karaops; Crews & Harvey, 2011

Type species
- K. ellenae Crews & Harvey, 2011

Species
- 54, see text

= Karaops =

Genus of spiders

Karaops is a genus of Australian wall spiders that was first described by S. C. Crews & Mark Stephen Harvey in 2011.

== Species ==
As of March 2023 it contains fifty-four species, found in New South Wales, South Australia, the Northern Territory, Queensland, and Western Australia:

- Karaops alanlongbottomi Crews & Harvey, 2011 – Australia (Western Australia)
- Karaops badgeradda Crews & Harvey, 2011 – Australia (Western Australia)
- Karaops banyjima Crews, 2013 – Australia (Western Australia)
- Karaops burbidgei Crews & Harvey, 2011 – Australia (Western Australia)
- Karaops conilurus Crews, 2023 – Australia (Western Australia)
- Karaops dalmanyi Crews, 2023 – Australia (Western Australia)
- Karaops dawara Crews & Harvey, 2011 – Australia (Northern Territory)
- Karaops dejongi Crews, 2023 – Australia (Western Australia)
- Karaops deserticola Crews & Harvey, 2011 – Australia (South Australia)
- Karaops durrantorum Crews, 2023 – Australia (Western Australia)
- Karaops ellenae Crews & Harvey, 2011 (type) – Australia (Western Australia)
- Karaops feedtime Crews, 2013 – Australia (Western Australia)
- Karaops forteyi Crews, 2013 – Australia (Western Australia)
- Karaops francesae Crews & Harvey, 2011 – Australia (Western Australia)
- Karaops gangarie Crews & Harvey, 2011 – Australia (Queensland)
- Karaops garyodwyeri Crews, 2023 – Australia (Western Australia)
- Karaops jaburrara Crews, 2013 – Australia (Western Australia)
- Karaops jarrit Crews & Harvey, 2011 – Australia (Western Australia)
- Karaops jawayway Crews, 2023 – Australia (Northern Territory)
- Karaops jenniferae Crews & Harvey, 2011 – Australia (Western Australia)
- Karaops joehaeneri Crews, 2023 – Australia (Western Australia)
- Karaops julianneae Crews & Harvey, 2011 – Australia (Western Australia)
- Karaops kariyarra Crews, 2013 – Australia (Western Australia)
- Karaops karrawarla Crews & Harvey, 2011 – Australia (Western Australia)
- Karaops keithlongbottomi Crews & Harvey, 2011 – Australia (Western Australia)
- Karaops kennerleyorum Crews, 2023 – Australia (Northern Territory)
- Karaops kwartatuma Crews, 2023 – Australia (Northern Territory)
- Karaops larapinta Crews, 2023 – Australia (Northern Territory)
- Karaops larryoo Crews & Harvey, 2011 – Australia (Western Australia)
- Karaops madhawundu Crews, 2023 – Australia (Queensland)
- Karaops malumbu Crews, 2023 – Australia (Western Australia)
- Karaops manaayn Crews & Harvey, 2011 – Australia (New South Wales)
- Karaops mareeba Crews, 2023 – Australia (Queensland)
- Karaops markharveyi Crews, 2023 – Australia (Western Australia, Northern Territory)
- Karaops marrayagong Crews & Harvey, 2011 – Australia (New South Wales)
- Karaops martamarta Crews & Harvey, 2011 – Australia (Western Australia)
- Karaops monteithi Crews & Harvey, 2011 – Australia (Queensland)
- Karaops morganoconnelli Crews, 2023 – Australia (Western Australia)
- Karaops mparntwe Crews, 2023 – Australia (Northern Territory)
- Karaops ngarluma Crews, 2013 – Australia (Western Australia)
- Karaops ngarutjaranya Crews & Harvey, 2011 – Australia (South Australia)
- Karaops nitmiluk Crews, 2023 – Australia (Northern Territory)
- Karaops nyamal Crews, 2013 – Australia (Western Australia)
- Karaops nyangumarta Crews, 2013 – Australia (Western Australia)
- Karaops nyiyaparli Crews, 2013 – Australia (Western Australia)
- Karaops pilkingtoni Crews & Harvey, 2011 – Australia (Northern Territory)
- Karaops raveni Crews & Harvey, 2011 – Australia (Queensland, New South Wales)
- Karaops strayamate Crews, 2023 – Australia (Queensland)
- Karaops toolbrunup Crews & Harvey, 2011 – Australia (Western Australia)
- Karaops umiida Crews, 2013 – Australia (Western Australia)
- Karaops vadlaadambara Crews & Harvey, 2011 – Australia (South Australia)
- Karaops yumbu Crews, 2013 – Australia (Western Australia)
- Karaops yumbubaarnji Crews, 2023 – Australia (Western Australia)
- Karaops yurlburr Crews, 2013 – Australia (Western Australia)
