= Makdiops =

Scientific classification
- Kingdom: Animalia
- Phylum: Arthropoda
- Subphylum: Chelicerata
- Class: Arachnida
- Order: Araneae
- Infraorder: Araneomorphae
- Family: Selenopidae
- Genus: Makdiops; Crews & Harvey, 2011

Type species
- M. montigena (Simon, 1889)

Species
- 6, see text

Genus of spiders

Makdiops is a genus of Asian wall spiders that was first described by S. C. Crews & Mark Stephen Harvey in 2011.

== Species ==
As of October 2022 it contains six species, found in Nepal and India:

- Makdiops agumbensis (Tikader, 1969) – India
- Makdiops mahishasura Crews & Harvey, 2011 – India
- Makdiops montigena (Simon, 1889) (type) – India, Nepal
- Makdiops nilgirensis (Reimoser, 1934) – India
- Makdiops shevaroyensis (Gravely, 1931) – India
- Makdiops shiva Crews & Harvey, 2011 – India
