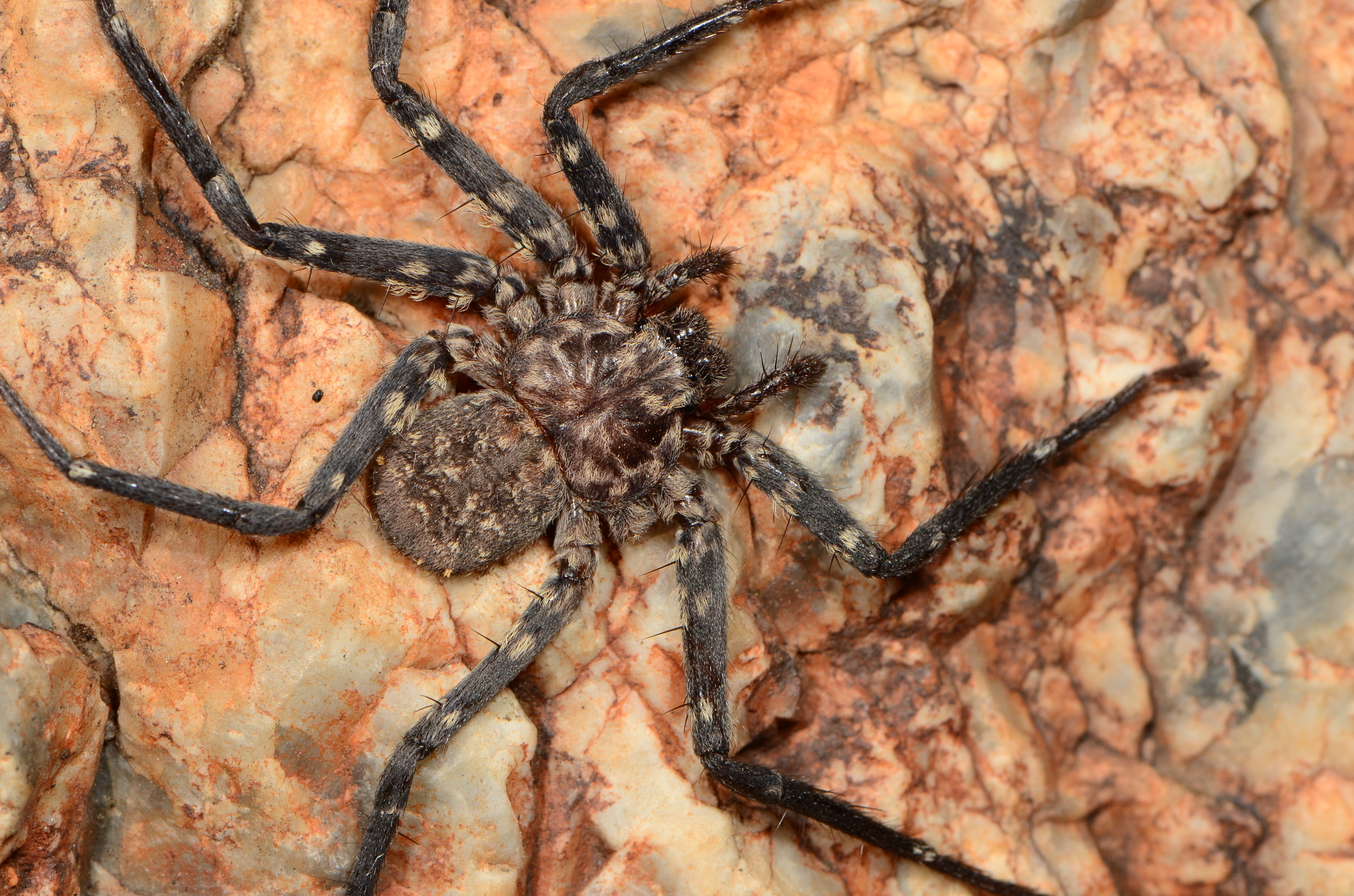
- Female Selenops ansieae
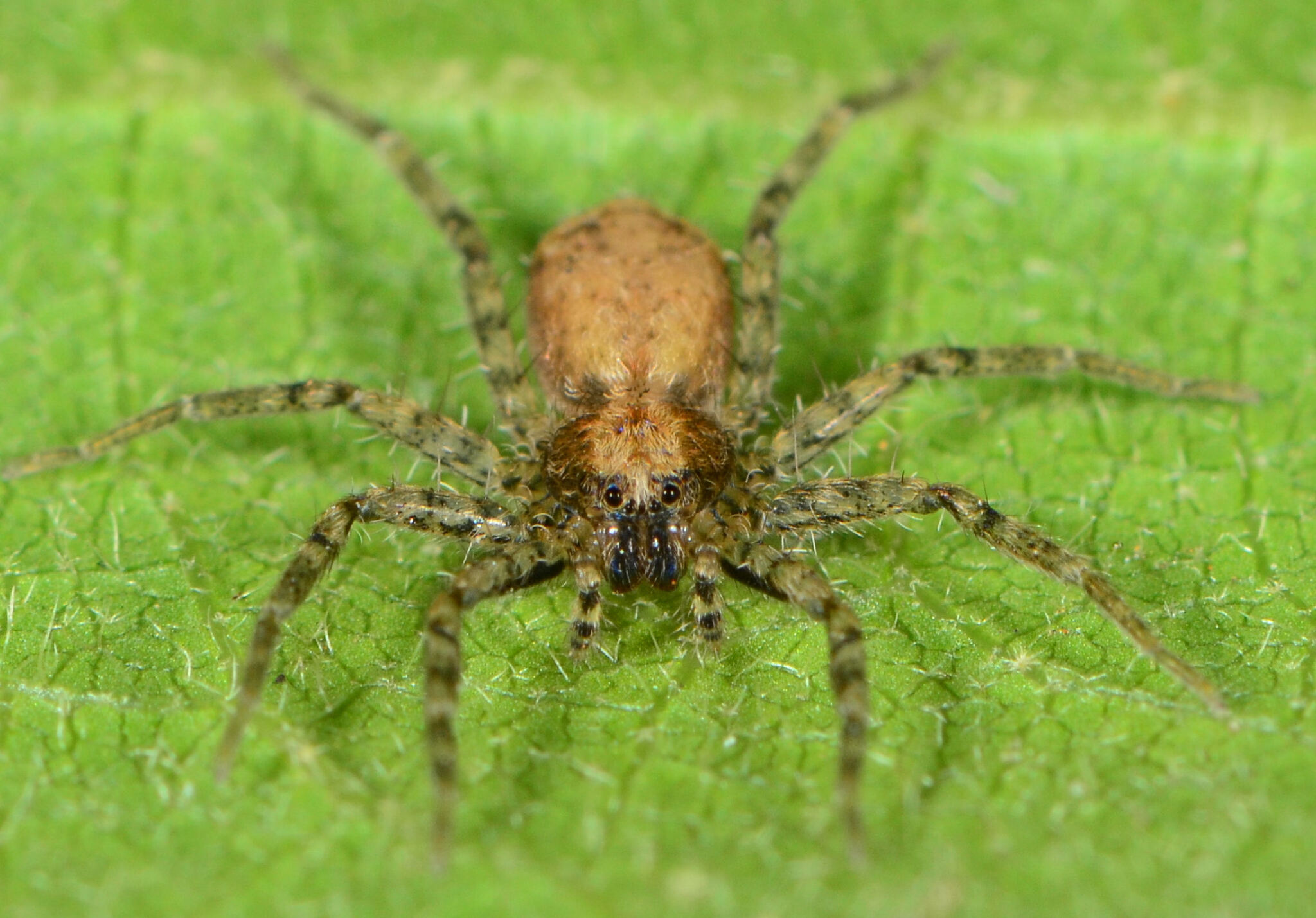
- Female Anyphops lucia

Scientific classification
- Kingdom: Animalia
- Phylum: Arthropoda
- Subphylum: Chelicerata
- Class: Arachnida
- Order: Araneae
- Infraorder: Araneomorphae
- Family: Selenopidae; Simon, 1897

Diversity
- 9 genera, 282 species
- blue: reported countries (WSC) green: observation hotspots (iNaturalist)

= Selenopidae =

Wall spiders Temporal range: Palaeogene–present

Family of spiders

Selenopidae, also called wall crab spiders, wall spiders and flatties, is a family of nocturnal, free-ranging, araneomorph spiders first described by Eugène Simon in 1897. It contains over 281 species in nine genera, of which Selenops is the most well-known.

This family is just one of several families whose English name includes the phrase "crab spider". These spiders are often called "Flatties" due to their flattened dorsal profile. The Afrikaans name for these spiders is "Muurspinnekop," which translates directly to "wall spider." The name Selenopidae comes from the greek moon goddess, Selene, as their eyes resemble the moon.

== Description ==
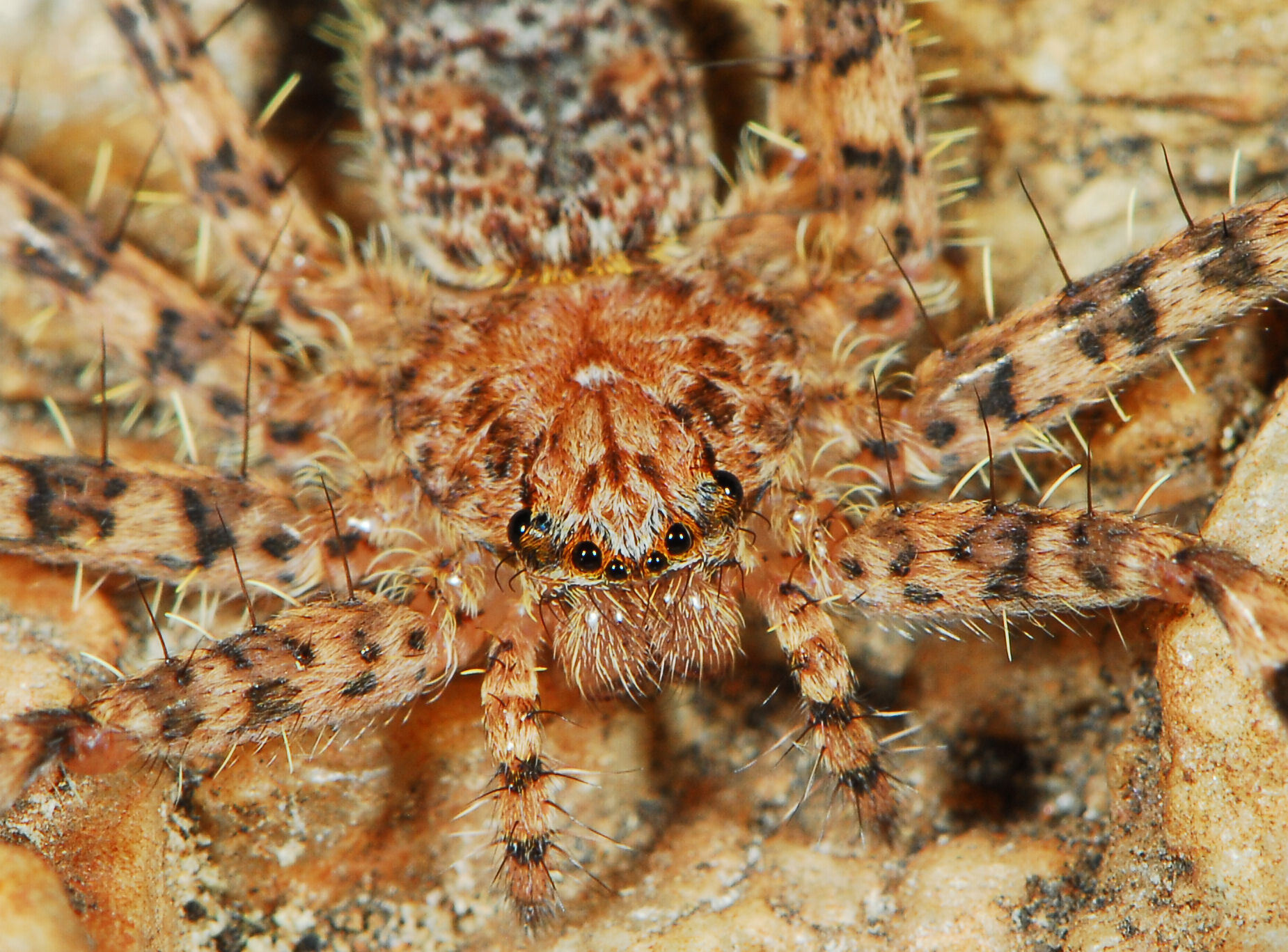
female Anyphops lawrencei

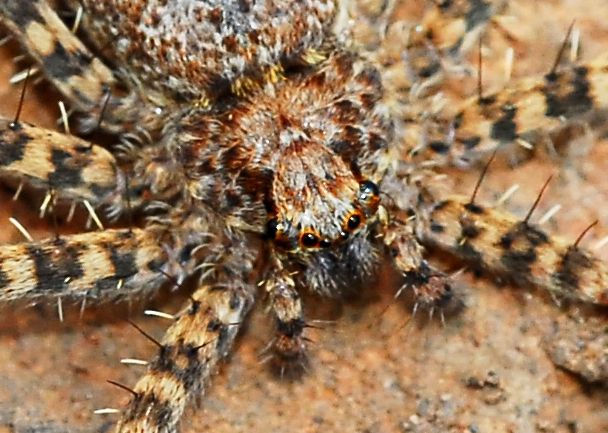
male Anyphops lawrencei

They are a variety of colors, including shades of grey, brown, yellow, and orange, with darker markings on the cephalothorax and spots or mottling on the abdomen, and annulations on the legs of most species. It is thought they mimic both lichens or rocks in their area. They are very flat dorsoventrally, and have two tarsal claws and laterigrade legs. Each of their legs face a different direction. Like most other Entelegynae, they have eight eyes arranged in two rows; one with six and one with two.

Although they are usually sedentary, their running and striking speeds place them among the world’s fastest animals, making them difficult to capture, while their coloring often makes them difficult to see. Their spin is the fastest leg-driven turning maneuver of any terrestrial animal, being able to strike their prey in an eighth of a second (three times the speed of a blink); therefore, the spiders' spins are being used by researchers in robotics applications. Dr. Zeng of UC Merced claims that the flattie spiders' "outward stance," which "tracks parallel to the ground" allows them to spin rapidly, giving them a "wider range of unrestricted motion."

== Habitat ==
They occur worldwide, from sea level to over 2,500 metres (8,200 ft), and are primarily tropical and subtropical, though several species are found in deserts. They are commonly found on walls or under rocks. Selenops is the most widely distributed and Anyphops is found throughout Sub-Saharan Africa. The remaining genera have more specific distributions. At least one (possibly extinct) species of Garcorops, G. jadis, is known only from subfossil copal.

== Genera ==
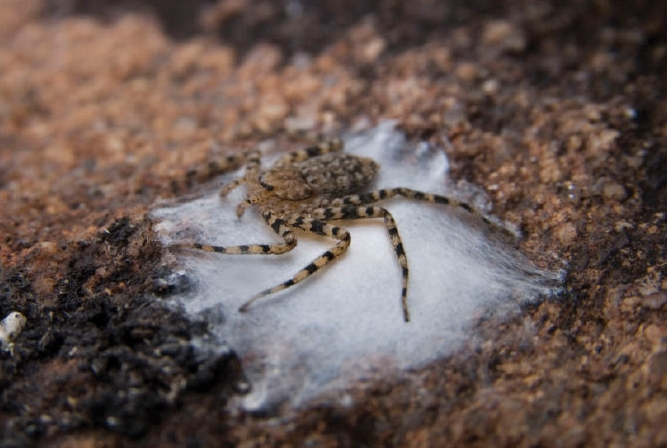
Karaops francesae

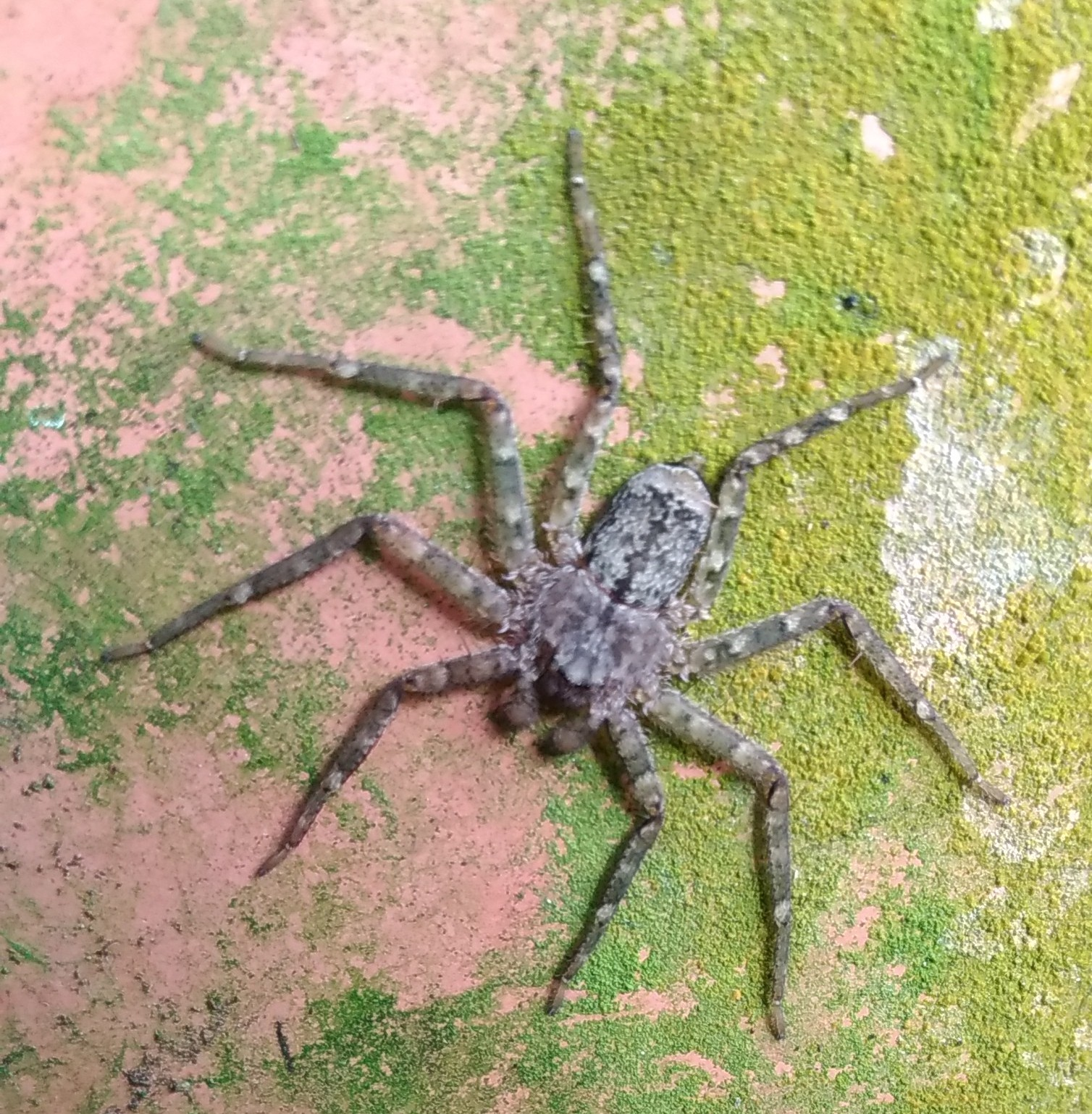
Siamspinops formosensis

As of January 2026, this family includes nine genera and 282 species:

- Amamanganops Crews & Harvey, 2011 – Philippines
- Anyphops Benoit, 1968 – Africa
- Garcorops Corronca, 2003 – Comoros, Madagascar
- Godumops Crews & Harvey, 2011 – Papua New Guinea
- Hovops Benoit, 1968 – Madagascar
- Karaops Crews & Harvey, 2011 – Australia
- Makdiops Crews & Harvey, 2011 – India, Nepal
- Selenops Latreille, 1819 – Africa, Asia, North America, South America
- Siamspinops Dankittipakul & Corronca, 2009 – China, Taiwan, Malaysia, Thailand, India

== See also ==
- Oecobius, another spider family commonly referred to as wall spiders.
