= 2004 in paleontology =

Paleontology or palaeontology is the study of prehistoric life forms on Earth through the examination of plant and animal fossils. This includes the study of body fossils, tracks (ichnites), burrows, cast-off parts, fossilised feces (coprolites), palynomorphs and chemical residues. Because humans have encountered fossils for millennia, paleontology has a long history both before and after becoming formalized as a science. This article records significant discoveries and events related to paleontology that occurred or were published in the year 2004.

== Protozoa ==
=== New taxa ===
Name	Novelty	Status	Authors	Age	Unit	Location	Notes	Images
Paleoleishmania	Gen et sp nov	Valid	Poinar & Poinar	Albian	Burmese amber	Myanmar	Oldest record of the protozoan family Trypanosomatidae, Type species P. proterus	Paleoleishmania proterus

== Fungi ==
=== newly named ===
Name	Novelty	Status	Authors	Age	Unit	Location	Notes	Images
Appianoporites	Gen et sp nov	Valid	Smith, Currah, & Stockey	Eocene	Appian Way Flora.	Canada	Extinct bracket fungus	
Quatsinoporites	Gen et sp nov	Valid	Smith, Currah, & Stockey	Barremian (Cretaceous)	Longarm Formation.	Canada	Extinct bracket fungus.	

== Plants ==
=== Newly named plants ===
Name	Novelty	Status	Authors	Age	Unit	Location	Notes	Images
Fagus langevinii	Sp nov	Valid	Manchester & Dillhoff	Ypresian	Tranquille Formation	Canada; British Columbia	A beech tree species	Fagus langevinii
Liquidambar changii	Sp nov.	Valid	Pigg, Ickert-Bond, & Wen	Middle Miocene	"Yakima Canyon Flora"	USA	A species of sweetgum	Liquidambar changii
Neviusia dunthornei	Sp nov	Valid	DeVore, Moore, Pigg, & Wehr	Eocene; Ypresian	Okanagan Highlands; Allenby Formation	Canada; British Columbia	oldest and only extinct species of Neviusia	
Palaeocarpinus dakotensis	Sp nov	Valid	Manchester & Chen	Paleocene; Tiffanian	Fort Union Group; Sentinel Butte Formation	USA; North Dakota	A betulaceous fruit	

== Arthropoda ==
=== newly named arachnids ===
Name	Novelty	Status	Authors	Age	Unit	Location	Notes	Images
?Anyphops cortex	sp nov	jr synonym	Wunderlich	Unknown	Madagascar copal	Madagascar	jr Synonym of Garcorops jadis	
Garcorops jadis	sp nov	Valid	Bosselaers	Unknown	Madagascar copal	Madagascar	Possibly extant, but copal age is not determined	

=== Newly named insects ===
Name	Novelty	Status	Authors	Age	Unit	Location	Notes	Images
Afromyrma	Gen et sp nov	valid	Dlussky, Brothers & Rasnitsyn	Turonian		Botswana	A Myrmicin ant, type species A. petrosa	
Afropone	Gen et sp nov	valid	Dlussky, Brothers & Rasnitsyn	Turonian		Botswana	A ponerin ant, two species	
Albicoccus	Fam, gen et sp nov	valid	Koteja	Albian - Cenomanian	Burmese amber	Myanmar	A scale insect, monotypic with Albicoccidae & A. dimai	
Burmacoccus	Fam, gen et sp nov	valid	Koteja	Albian - Cenomanian	Burmese amber	Myanmar	A scale insect, monotypic with Burmacoccidae & B. danyi	
Carebara antiqua	Comb nov	valid	(Mayr, 1868)	Middle Eocene	Baltic amber	Europe	Fossil myrmicine ant	Carebara antiqua
Electrostephanus janzeni	Sp nov	jr synonym	Engel	Lutetian	Baltic Amber	Russia	A stephanid wasp	
Gerontoformica	Gen et sp nov	valid	Nel & Perrault	Albian - Cenomanian	Charentese amber	France	A stem group ant, type species G. cretacica	Gerontoformica cretacica
Marmyan	gen et sp nov	valid	Koteja	Cenomanian	Burmese amber	Myanmar	A scale insect, monotypic M. barbarae	
Microberotha	Gen et sp nov	Valid	Archibald	Ypresian	Hat Creek Amber	Canada	A Berothid lacewing	
Palaeomyia	Gen et sp nov	Valid	Poinar	Cenomanian	Burmese amber	Myanmar	A Phlebotomidae sand fly, type species P. burmitis	Palaeomyia burmitis

== Molluscs ==
=== Cephalopods ===
Name	Novelty	Status	Authors	Age	Unit	Location	Notes	Images
Conlinites	Gen et sp nov	Valid	Kennedy	Early Cretaceous (Albian)	Paw Paw Formation	USA (Texas)	An ammonite, type species is C. wrighti.	
Enigmaticeras	Gen et sp nov	Valid	Kennedy	Early Cretaceous (Albian)	Paw Paw Formation	USA (Texas)	An ammonite, type species is E. riceae.	
Ficheuria americana	Sp nov	Valid	Kennedy	Early Cretaceous (Albian)	Paw Paw Formation	USA (Texas)	An ammonite.	
Mariella (Mariella) asper	Sp nov	Valid	Kennedy	Early Cretaceous (Albian)	Paw Paw Formation	USA (Texas)	An ammonite.	
Neophlycticeras (Paradolphia) occidentalis	Sp nov	Valid	Kennedy	Early Cretaceous (Albian)	Paw Paw Formation	USA (Texas)	An ammonite.	

== Newly named fishes ==
Name	Novelty	Status	Authors	Age	Unit	Location	Notes	Images
Gomphonchus? minutus	Sp. nov	Valid	Valiukevičius	Late Silurian	Minija Formation	Latvia	An acanthodian belonging to the group Ischnacanthiformes and the family Ischnacanthidae.	
Lophosteus canadensis	Sp. nov	Valid	Schultze & Märss	Late Silurian	Barlow Inlet Formation	Canada	A bony fish belonging to the group Lophosteiformes.	
Lophosteus ohesaarensis	Sp. nov	Valid	Schultze & Märss	Late Silurian		Estonia; Latvia	A bony fish belonging to the group Lophosteiformes.	
Lophosteus uralensis	Sp. nov	Valid	Schultze & Märss	Early Devonian		Russia	A bony fish belonging to the group Lophosteiformes.	
Nostolepis alifera	Sp. nov	Valid	Valiukevičius	Late Silurian	Targale Formation	Latvia	An acanthodian belonging to the group Climatiiformes and the family Climatiidae.	
Nostolepis latvica	Sp. nov	Valid	Valiukevičius	Late Silurian	Minija Formation; Targale Formation	Latvia	An acanthodian belonging to the group Climatiiformes and the family Climatiidae.	
Perscheia	Gen. et sp. nov	Valid	Elliott, Mark-Kurik & Daeschler	Devonian (Frasnian)	Nordstrand Point Formation	Canada	A member of Pteraspidiformes belonging to the group Psammosteida and the family Obrucheviidae. The type species is P. pulla	
Poracanthodes marssae	Sp. nov	Valid	Valiukevičius	Late Silurian	Targale Formation	Estonia; Latvia	An acanthodian belonging to the group Ischnacanthiformes and the family Poracanthidae.	
Poracanthodes sulcatus	Sp. nov	Valid	Valiukevičius	Late Silurian	Targale Formation	Estonia; Latvia	An acanthodian belonging to the group Ischnacanthiformes and the family Poracanthidae.	
Talimaalepis	Gen. et sp. nov	Valid	Žigaitė	Silurian	Dashtygoi Formation; Kyzyl-Tchiraa Formation; Tchergak Formation	Mongolia; Russia	A thelodont, possibly a member of the group Phlebolepidiformes. The type species is T. rimae	
Trimpleylepis	Gen. et 2 sp. nov	Valid	Miller, Märss & Blom	Late Silurian		Estonia; United Kingdom	A member of Anaspida belonging to the group Birkeniida, possibly a member of the family Septentrioniidae. The type species is T. juncta; genus also includes T. concatenata.	

== Newly named amphibians ==
Name	Novelty	Status	Authors	Age	Unit	Location	Notes	Images
Jakubsonia	Gen. et sp. nov	Valid	Lebedev	Devonian (Famennian)		Russia	A basal member of Tetrapoda. The type species is J. livnensis	

== Reptile ==
=== Archosauromorphs ===
==== Newly named dinosaurs ====
Data courtesy of George Olshevsky's dinosaur genera list.

Name	Novelty	Status	Authors	Age	Unit	Location	Notes	Images
Atrociraptor		Valid	Currie & Varricchio	Edmontonian	Horseshoe Canyon Formation	Canada		Atrociraptor
Bashunosaurus	Gen et sp nov	Valid	Kuang	Middle Jurassic	Xiashaximiao Formation	China		
Bissektipelta	Gen et sp nov	Valid	Parish & Barrett	Cenomanian-Turonian	Bissekty Formation	Uzbekistan		
Bonatitan	Gen et sp nov	Valid	Martinelli & Forasiepi	Late Cretaceous	Bajo de Santa Rosa	Argentina		
Bonitasaura	Gen et sp nov	Valid	Apesteguía	late Cretaceous	Bajo de la Carpa Formation	Argentina		Bonitasaura
Borealosaurus	Gen et sp nov	Valid	You, Ji, Lamanna, Li, & Li	late Cretaceous	Sunjiawan Formation	China		
Dilong	Gen et sp nov	Valid	Xu, Norell, Kuang, Wang, Zhao, & Jia	Early Cretaceous	Yixian Formation	China		Dilong
Ekrixinatosaurus	Gen et sp nov	Valid	Calvo, Rubilar-Rogers, & Moreno	Late Cretaceous	Candeleros Formation	Argentina		Ekrixinatosaurus
Graciliraptor		Valid	Xing & Wang	Barremian	Yixian Formation	China		
Huaxiagnathus		Valid	Hwang, Norell, Ji, & Gao	Barremian	Yixian Formation	China		Huaxiagnathus
Kerberosaurus		Valid	Bolotsky & Godefroit	Late Cretaceous		Russia		
Limaysaurus		Valid	Salgado, Garrido, Cocca, & Cocca			Argentina		Limaysaurus
Mei		Valid	Xu & Norell	Barremian	Yixian Formation	China		Mei
Mirischia		Valid	Naish, Martill, & Frey	Albian	Santana Formation	Brazil		Mirischia
Nemegtia		Preoccupied name	Lü, Tomida, Azuma, Dong, Lee, & Szczechura				Renamed Nemegtomaia	
Otogosaurus		Nomen nudum	Zhao & Tan					
Prenoceratops		Valid	Chinnery			USA; Montana		Prenoceratops
Rugops		Valid	Sereno, Wilson, & Conrad			Niger		Rugops
Sinusonasus		Valid	Xu, & Wang	Barremian	Yixian Formation	China		
Spinostropheus		Valid	Sereno, Wilson & Conrad	Middle Jurassic	Irhazer Group	Niger	A ceratosaur; new genus for "Elaphrosaurus" gautieri Lapparent 1960.	
Suuwassea		Valid	Harris & Dodson	Kimmeridgian	Morrison Formation	United States		Suuwassea
Talenkauen		Valid		Novas, Cambiaso, & Ambrosio	Pari Aike Formation	Argentina		Talenkauen
Tazoudasaurus		Valid		Allain et al		Morocco		
Unaysaurus		Valid		Leal, Azevedo, Kellner, & Da Rosa	Caturrita Formation	Brazil		Unaysaurus

==== Pterosaurs ====
===== New taxa =====
Name	Status	Authors	Age	Unit	Location	Notes
Avgodectes	Valid	Peters	Early Cretaceous	Yixian Formation	China	A pterosaur hatchling.
Cacibupteryx	Valid	Gasparini Fernández de la Fuente	Late Jurassic (Oxfordian)	Jagua Formation	Cuba	A rhamphorhynchid.
"Daitingopterus"	Nomen Nudum	Maisch Matzke Ge Sun	Late Jurassic (Tithonian)	Solnhofen Limestone	Germany	A germanodactylid.
Lonchognathosaurus	Valid	Maisch, M.W., Matzke, A.T., and Ge Sun	Early Cretaceous (Aptian)	Lianmuqin Formation	China	A dsungaripterid.

=== Other archosauromorphs ===
Name	Status	Authors Location		Notes	Images
Crosbysaurus	Valid non-dinosaurian taxon.	Heckert	USA		
Protecovasaurus	Valid non-dinosaurian taxon.	Heckert	USA		

=== Newly named birds ===
Name	Status	Novelty	Authors	Age	Unit	Location	Notes	Images
Aberratiodontus	Valid	Gen et sp. nov.	Gong, Hou & Wang	Early Cretaceous	Jiufotang Formation	China	An Enantiornithes, Type species A. wui	
Anserpica kiliani	Valid	Gen et sp. nov.	Cécile Mourer-Chauviré Didier Berthet Marguerite Hugueney	Late Oligocene, Early Miocene	MP 29	France	An Anseranatidae, the type species of Anserpica Mourer-Chauviré, Berthet & Hugueney, 2004.	
Bavaripsitta ballmanni	Valid	Gen et sp. nov.	Gerald Mayr Ursula B. Göhlich	Middle Miocene	Mn 6	Germany: Bavaria	A Psittacidae, the type species of Bavaripsitta Mayr & Göhlich, 2004.	
Borvocarbo guilloti	Valid	Gen et sp. nov.	Cécile Mourer-Chauviré Didier Berthet Marguerite Hugueney	Late Oligocene, Early Miocene	MP 30, MN 1	France; Germany	A Phalacrocoracidae, the type species of Borvocarbo Mourer-Chauviré, Berthet & Hugueney, 2004.	
?Colymboides metzleri	Valid	Sp. nov.	Gerald Mayr	Early Oligocene	Rupelian	Germany: Baden-Württemberg; Belgium: Antwerp	A Gaviidae, not certain a species of Colymboides Milne-Edwards, 1868.	
Eurotrochilus inexpectatus	Valid	Gen et sp. nov.	Gerald Mayr	Early Oligocene	Rupelian	Germany: Baden-Württemberg	A Trochilidae, the type species of Eurotrochilus Mayr, 2004.	
Iaceornis marshi	Valid	Gen et sp. nov.	Julia A. Clarke	Late Cretaceous	Niobrara Formation	USA: Kansas	An Ornithurae, the type species of Iaceornis Clarke, 2004.	
Longirostravis hani	Valid	Gen et sp. nov.	Hou Lianhai Luis M. Chiappe Zhang Fucheng Chuong Cheng-Ming	Early Cretaceous	Yixian Formation	China	An Enantiornithes, Euenantiornithes, the type species of Longirostravis Hou, Chiappe, Zhang et Chuong, 2004.	
Meridiocichla salotti	Valid	Gen et sp. nov.	Antoine Louchart	Late Quaternary	Corsica, Crete	France: Corsica; Greece	A Turdidae, the type species of Meridiocichla Louchart, 2004.	
Miopica paradoxa	Valid	Gen et sp. nov.	Evgeny N. Kurochkin Denis V. Sobolev	Miocene	Middle Meothis MN 10	Ukraine	A Corvidae, the type species of Miopica Kurochkin & Sobolev, 2004.	
Mirolia brevirostrata	Valid	Gen et sp. nov.	Peter Ballmann	Middle Miocene	MN 6	Germany: Bavaria	A Scolopacidae, the type species of Mirolia Ballmann, 2004.	
Mirolia dubia	Valid	Sp. nov.	Peter Ballmann	Middle Miocene	MN 6	Germany: Bavaria	A Scolopacidae.	
?Mirolia mascalidris	Valid	Sp. nov.	Peter Ballmann	Middle Miocene	MN 6	Germany: Bavaria	A Scolopacidae, not certain to belong in Mirolia Ballmann, 2004.	
Mirolia parvula	Valid	Sp. nov.	Peter Ballmann	Middle Miocene	MN 6	Germany: Bavaria	A Scolopacidae.	
Primobucco frugilegus	Valid	Sp. nov.	Gerald Mayr Cécile Mourer-Chauviré Ilka Weidig	Middle Eocene	Messel pit, MP 11	Germany: Hessen	A Primobucconidae Feduccia et Martin, 1976.	
Primobucco perneri	Valid	Sp. nov.	Gerald Mayr Cécile Mourer-Chauviré Ilka Weidig	Middle Eocene	Messel pit MP 11	Germany: Hessen	A Primobucconidae Feduccia et Martin, 1976.	
Ramphastosula ramirezi	Valid	Gen et sp. nov.	Marcelo Stucchi Mario Urbina	Early Pliocene	Pisco Formation	Peru	A Sulidae, the type species of Ramphastosula Stucchi & Urbina, 2004.	
Tyto mourerchauvireae	Valid	Sp. nov.	Marco Pavia	Early-Middle Pleistocene	Sicily	Italy: Sicily	A Tytonidae.	
Vescornis hebeiensis	Valid	Gen et sp. nov.	Zhang Fucheng Per G.P. Ericson Zhou Zhonghe	Early Cretaceous	Yixian Formation	China	An Enentiornithes Walker, 1981, this is the type species of the new genus, most probably a junior synonym of Hebeiornis fengningensis Yan, 1999.	
Vitirallus watlingi	Valid	Gen et sp. nov.	Trevor H. Worthy	Holocene	Viti Levu	Fiji	A Rallidae, the type species of Vitirallus Worthy, 2004.	
Wingegyps cartellei	Valid	Gen et sp. nov.	Herculano M. F. de Alvarenga Storrs L. Olson	Late Pleistocene or Early Holocene	Gruta dos Brejões	Brazil	A Cathartidae, the type species of Wingegyps Alvarenga & Olson, 2004.	

=== New taxa ===
Name	Status	Authors	Age	Unit	Location	Notes
Plesiopterys	Valid	O'Keefe	Toarcian	Posidonienschiefer	Germany	

== Synapsids ==
=== Non-mammalian ===
Name	Status	Authors	Age	Unit	Location	Notes	Images
Ianthodon	Valid	Kissel & Reisz	Kasimovian		USA		Lobalopex
Lobalopex	Valid	Sidor, Hopson and Keyser	Lopingian	Teekloof Formation	South Africa		Lobalopex
Progalesaurus	Valid	Sidor & Smith	Induan	Balfour Formation	South Africa		Lobalopex
Pyozia	Valid	Anderson and Reisz	Capitanian	Krasnoschelsk Formation	Russia		Lobalopex
Rewaconodon	Valid	Datta, Das & Luo	Late Triassic	Tiki Formation	India		Lobalopex

== Other Animals ==
Name	Status	Authors	Age	Unit	Location	Notes	Images
Charniodiscus procerus	Valid	LaFlamme et al., 2004	Ediacaran	Mistaken Point Formation and Trepassey Formation	Canada		
