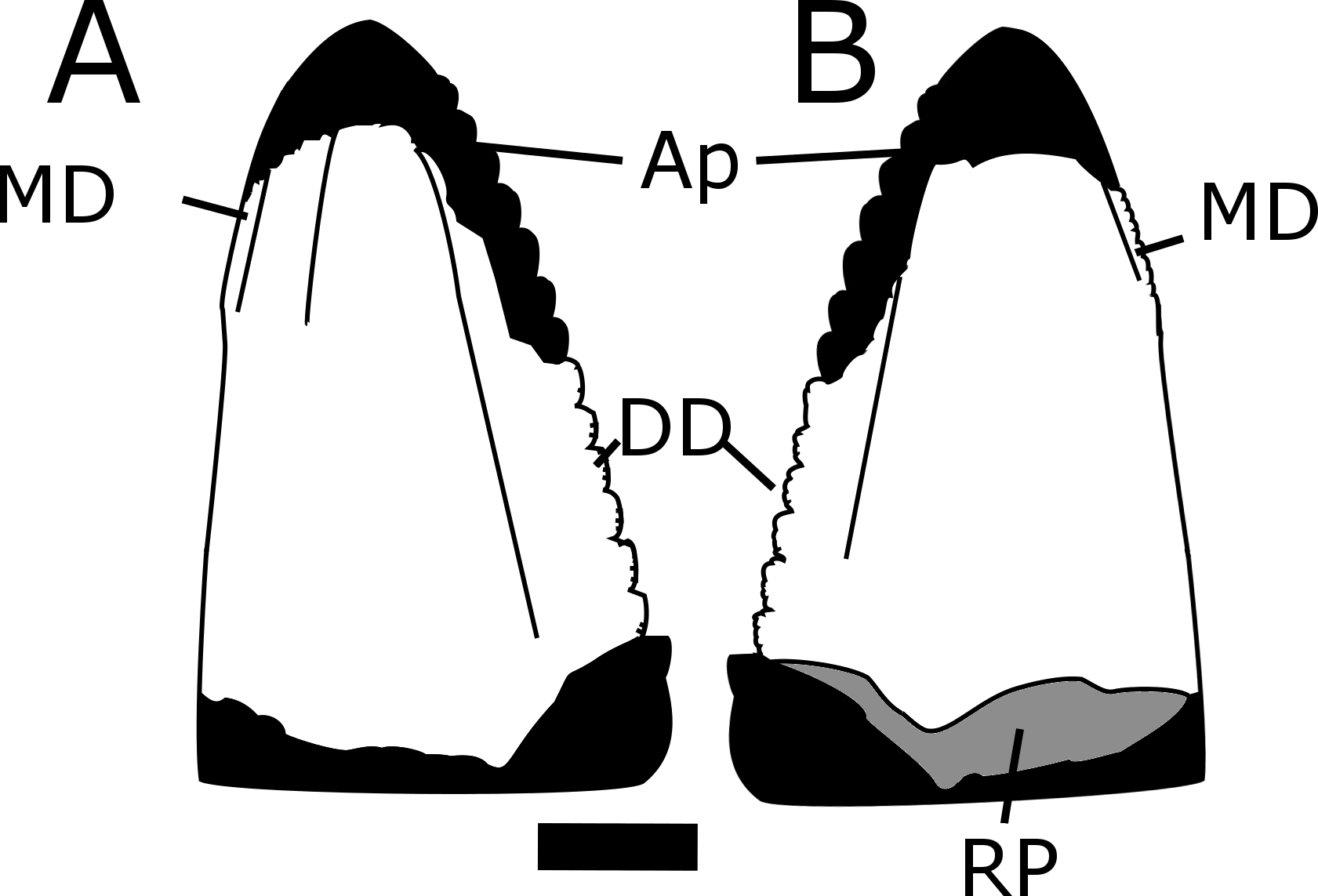
- Referred tooth, MNA V10666

Scientific classification
- Kingdom: Animalia
- Phylum: Chordata
- Class: Reptilia
- Clade: Archosauriformes
- Clade: incertae sedis
- Genus: †Crosbysaurus; Heckert, 2004
- Species: †C. harrisae

Binomial name
- †Crosbysaurus harrisae Heckert, 2004

= Crosbysaurus =

Crosbysaurus Temporal range: Late Triassic, 205–200 Ma

Genus of reptiles

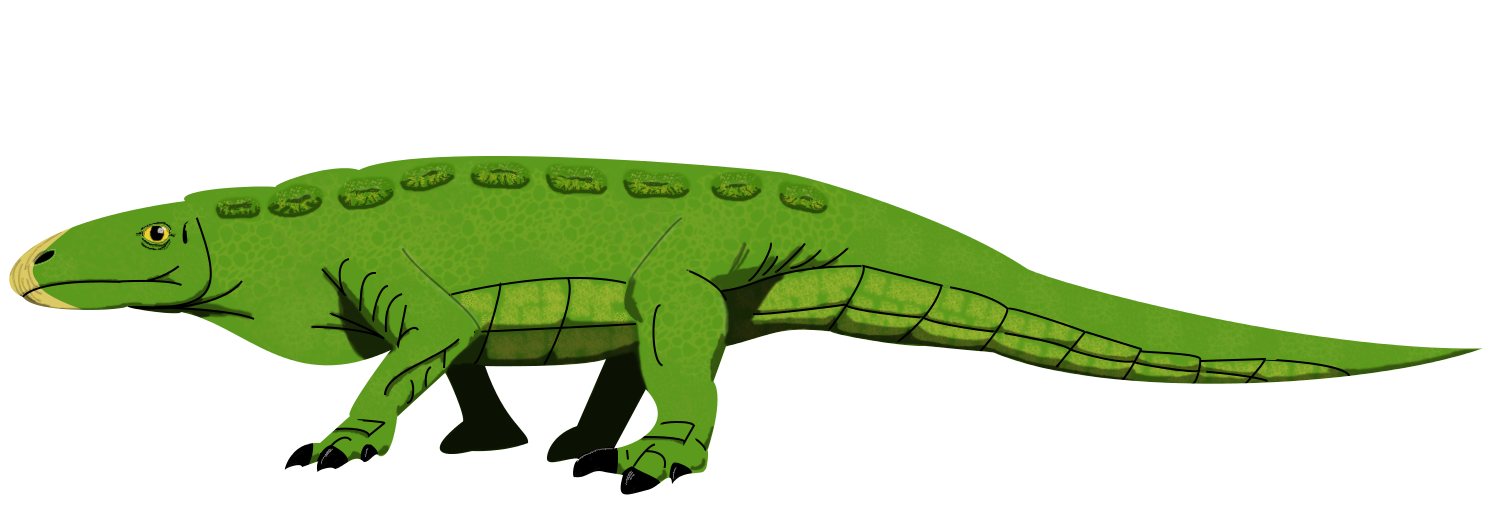
Extremely hypothetical life restoration

Crosbysaurus is a genus of extinct archosauromorph that lived in the Late Triassic of Arizona, New Mexico, North Carolina, Texas, and Utah. It is known from the Chinle Formation and Dockum Group rock units from the southwestern United States. The type species is C. harrisae, and the only known material includes teeth. 11 specimens are known, each including a single tooth.

Crosbysaurus was originally identified as an ornithischian dinosaur by Andrew Heckert when it was first described in 2004. Further work has shown that it is likely an archosauromorph based on the features of its teeth, and it may belong to Archosauriformes. The taxon is likely valid as it differs from other genera from the same region known from teeth like Revueltosaurus, Tecovasaurus, Krzyzanowskisaurus, Lucianosaurus, and Protecovasaurus.

== Description ==
The teeth of Crosbysaurus are triangular in outline with serrations on both edges. Almost all specimens have "compound denticles"; serrations with their own subdivisions. The serrations on the trailing (posterior/distal) edge of the tooth are always larger than the leading (anterior/mesial) edge. The teeth are small, approximately 3-5 millimeters tall. Owing to their blunt outline it is presumed that Crosbysaurus was a herbivore.
