= Neviusia alabamensis =

Species of shrub

Neviusia alabamensis, the Alabama snow-wreath, is a small shrub which is native to the Southeastern United States. ''It is recognized by its distinctive white, feathery blooms and its ability to grow in rocky limestone and woodland environments. Due to the Neviusia alabamensis poor reproductive ability and waining population the species is vulnerable and is a major concern for conservation efforts.

Neviusia alabamensis is considered rare throughout its range. It is found in widely scattered populations from northwestern Georgia to the Ozark Mountains, but the populations are thought to be mostly asexual clones, as no seed production has been observed. Because of its thinly scattered distribution and low genetic variability, it is of conservation concern. Its natural habitat is limestone woodlands with seasonal moisture.

There are two other members of the genus Neviusia, the California endemic species Neviusia cliftonii, and the extinct species Neviusia dunthornei.

== Taxonomic hierarchy ==
The taxonomy of the Neviusia alabamensis is Kingdom: Plantae, Subkingdom: Viridiplantae, Infrakingdom: Streptophyta, Superdivision: Embryophyta, Division: Tracheophyta, Subdivision: Spermatophytina, Class: Magnoliopsida, Superorder: Rosanae, Order: Rosales, Family: Rosaceae, Genus: Neviusia, and Species: Neviusia alabamensis.

Threats and Conservation

Neviusia Alabamensis has been proposed for federal listing under the Endangered Species Act; However, it currently holds no federal protection under the Endangered Species Act. Its population in Poplar Bluff, Missouri, has been extirpated.

The IUCN Red List has not evaluated Neviusia Alabamensis. Because the IUCN has not assessed it, agencies rely on state-level, national, and global rankings to track its status. Globally, the status of Neviusia Alabamensis is G3 (vulnerable). Nationally, it is ranked as N3 (vulnerable). The reasoning behind these rankings is as follows: sexual reproduction does not appear to be occurring due to little or no observation of seedlings at any sites. The species has been cultivated far North of its natural range; however, wild populations are restricted to conditions near the boundary of the Mississippi Embayment of the Gulf of Mexico Coastal Plain. Additionally, invasive species are found near wild populations and pose a possible threat to Neviusia alabamensis.

The Degree of Threat of Neviusia alabamensis is medium; many sites in Alabama are in remote locations, with rocky habitats providing protection from various threats. The potential threats are as follows: timber harvesting, recreational development, encroachment by undesirable weedy species, grazing, urban expansion, and forest management practices.

== Physical description ==
Neviusia alabamensis is typically around 3-6 feet, both height and width, and starts out more dense while young but usually opens up more as it ages. As for colors, the leaves are a blunt green, the bark is a mix of brown and orange, and the sticks are a pale yellow. It blooms in the month of May and the blooms are feathery and white in color.

== Geographic range & habitat ==
This shrub appears in the following states: AL, AR, GA, MO, MS, TN. Only a single specimen was found in Missouri and has since been removed. It was thought to be exclusive to the state of Alabama, however, nearly a century after its discovery, it was found in the other nearby states listed prior. It typically grows in thin, neutral soil on top of rocks like limestone or shale. It is praised for being as beautiful as it is despite growing in light to heavy shade.

== Reproduction & adaptation ==
The Neviusia alabemensis is an endangered species largely due to its poor reproductive abilities. Its vegetative growth happens mostly by root suckering. Root suckering is the process where stiff shoots sprout from an underground complex of a plant or tree’s roots. By most reports the Neviusia alabemensis no longer produces seeds, and fruit has never been seen from it; however, the plant does flower and produces very mild amounts of pollen, about 5%, averaging over the multiple populations. There is some mild genetic difference between populations but very little evidence of noticeable adaptation. This constitutes a large reason why the Neviusia alabamensis is considered endangered.

== Phylogenetics ==
Neviusia alabamensis belongs to the tribe Kerrieae within the Rosaceae family. Molecular phylogenetic studies have identified Kerria as the most closely related genus to Neviusia, with Coleogyne and Rhodotypos also belonging to the same tribe.⁽¹⁾ The closest living relative of N. alabamensis is Neviusia cliftonii, a species native to northern California and the only other living species in the genus.⁽²⁾ In 2004, researchers described an extinct species, Neviusia dunthornei, from fossilized leaves discovered in southern British Columbia, Canada, dating back to the early-to-middle Eocene. The fossilized leaves more closely resemble those of N. cliftonii than those of N. alabamensis. This discovery provided the first fossil evidence of the tribe Kerrieae.⁽³⁾ The fossil evidence and the geographical separation of the two living species suggest that Neviusia was once more widely distributed across North America.

Neviusia alabamensis
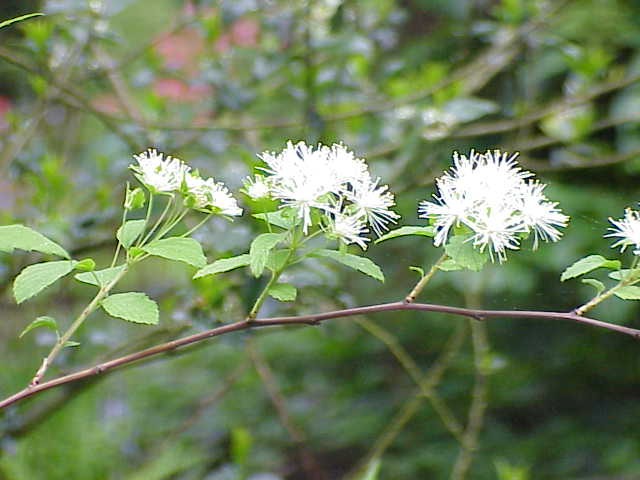

Conservation status
- Imperiled (NatureServe)

Scientific classification
- Kingdom: Plantae
- Clade: Tracheophytes
- Clade: Angiosperms
- Clade: Eudicots
- Clade: Rosids
- Order: Rosales
- Family: Rosaceae
- Genus: Neviusia
- Species: N. alabamensis

Binomial name
- Neviusia alabamensis Gray
