= Neviusia dunthornei =

Neviusia dunthornei Temporal range: Ypresian

Scientific classification
- Kingdom: Plantae
- Clade: Tracheophytes
- Clade: Angiosperms
- Clade: Eudicots
- Clade: Rosids
- Order: Rosales
- Family: Rosaceae
- Genus: Neviusia
- Species: †N. dunthornei

Binomial name
- †Neviusia dunthornei DeVore, Moore, Pigg, & Wehr, 2004

Extinct species of flowering plant

Neviusia dunthornei is an extinct species of flowering plants in the family Rosaceae. The species is solely known from the early Eocene, Ypresian stage, Allenby Formation Lacustrine deposits near the town of Princeton, British Columbia.

== History and classification ==
Neviusia dunthornei is known from only two fossils, the holotype, number "UWBM 54169", and the paratype number "UWBM 97148". Both specimens are preserved in the paleobotanical collections housed in the Burke Museum of Natural History and Culture, part of the University of Washington in Seattle, Washington, USA. The species was described from the two leaf specimens found at the One Mile Creek locality, UWBM number 53355 in 1991 by Wesley Wehr and Peter Dunthorne. This locality is in the early Eocene Allenby Formation, designated the type locality. The Allenby Formation is part of the Eocene Okanogan Highlands floras which span from the Klondike Mountain Formation in Ferry County, Washington north-west to Driftwood Canyon Provincial Park near Smithers, British Columbia.

The specimens were studied by paleobotanists Melanie L. DeVore and Steven M. Moore of Georgia College and State University, Kathleen B. Pigg of Arizona State University and Wesley C. Wehr of the Burke Museum. Melanie DeVore and coauthors published the 2004 type description for N. dunthornei in the journal Rhodora. Melanie DeVore and coauthors chose the specific name dunthornei, in honor of Peter Dunthorne of Sedro-Woolley, Washington in recognition of the collecting work throughout the Okanagan highlands which he helped and participated with.

The holotype of Neviusia dunthornei is a complete leaf though the leaf blade is folded near the base, while the paratype is more fragmentary. Together the two compression-impression fossil leaves, preserved in light green-grey shale display the leaf shape, margin, and morphology of the vein structure and teeth. The overall morphology and structure of the N. dunthornei leaves compare to the living species known as the Shasta snow-wreath (N. cliftonii), being broadly ovate, with secondary veins subopposite and a similar overall vein patterning. The leaf margins are serrate with two to three orders of teeth present. Unlike N. dunthornei the leaves of N. alabamensis are in general more elongate with finer teeth and secondary veins which are more alternate. N. dunthornei differs from both modern genera in the leaves having an overall thicker midrib.

The presence of Neviusia in the Eocene Okanogan Highlands floras suggests the tribe Kerrieae originated in Asia and radiated to North America but did not become a major floristic component. This is supported by the absence of any Kerrieae tribe genera in the Mississippi embayment Eocene formations such as the Claiborne Formation.
