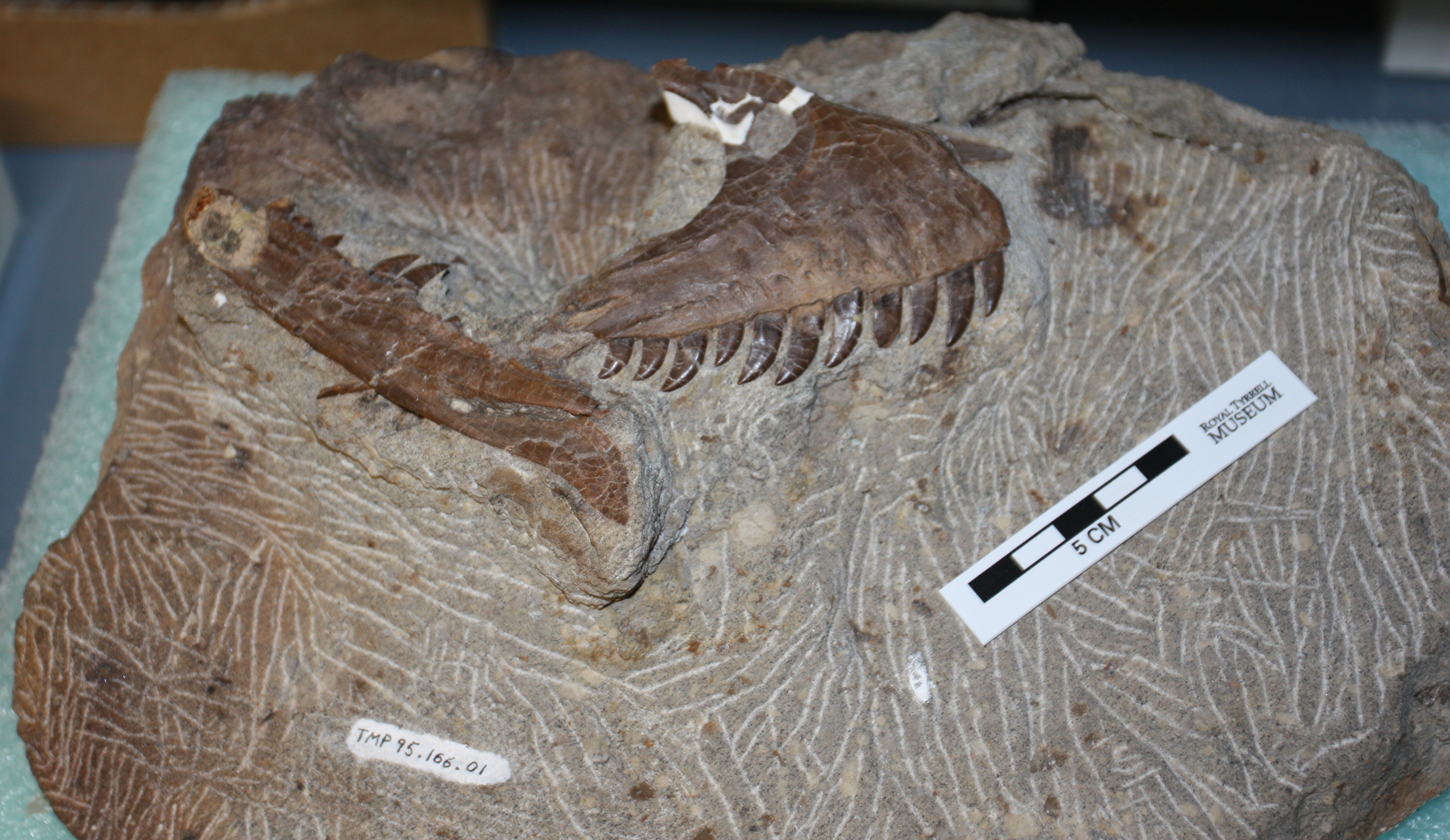
- Holotype jaw remains in the Royal Tyrrell Museum of Palaeontology

Scientific classification
- Kingdom: Animalia
- Phylum: Chordata
- Class: Reptilia
- Clade: Dinosauria
- Clade: Saurischia
- Clade: Theropoda
- Family: †Dromaeosauridae
- Clade: †Eudromaeosauria
- Subfamily: †Saurornitholestinae
- Genus: †Atrociraptor; Currie & Varricchio, 2004
- Species: †A. marshalli

Binomial name
- †Atrociraptor marshalli Currie & Varricchio, 2004

= Atrociraptor =

Atrociraptor Temporal range: Late Cretaceous (Maastrichtian), 72.2–71.5 Ma Possibly lived to 68 Ma

Extinct genus of dinosaurs

Atrociraptor (/əˌtrɑːsiˈræptər/) is a genus of dromaeosaurid dinosaur that lived during the Late Cretaceous in what is now Alberta, Canada. The first specimen, a partial skull, was discovered in 1995 by the fossil collector Wayne Marshall in the Horseshoe Canyon Formation, about 5 km (3 mi) from the Royal Tyrrell Museum of Palaeontology where it was brought for preparation. In 2004, the specimen became the holotype of the new genus and species Atrociraptor marshalli; the generic name is Latin for "savage robber", and the specific name refers to Marshall. The holotype consists of the premaxillae (frontmost bones of the upper jaw), a maxilla (main bone of the upper jaw), the dentaries (tooth-bearing bones of the lower jaw), associated teeth, and other skull fragments. Isolated teeth from the same formation have since been assigned to Atrociraptor.

Estimated to have measured about 1.8–2 m (5.9–6.6 ft) in length and weighed 15 kg (33 lb), Atrociraptor was a relatively small dromaeosaurid. As a dromaeosaurid, it would have had a large sickle-claw on the second toe and pennaceous feathers. Atrociraptor differs from its contemporary relatives in that its face is much deeper, and its teeth are more strongly inclined backwards than in most other dromaeosaurids and are almost all the same size. It also differed from most relatives in details of the skull, such as the part of the premaxilla below the nostril being taller than long, and in that its maxillary fenestra was larger. The fragmentary nature of the holotype has made the exact relations of Atrociraptor uncertain; it was initially thought to be a velociraptorine, but is now considered a saurornitholestine.

Atrociraptor is thought to have been specialised for attacking larger prey than other dromaeosaurids, due to its deep snout. Various ideas for how dromaeosaurids used their sickle-claws have been proposed, and 21st-century studies suggest they used them to grasp and restrain struggling prey while dismembering them with the mouth. The holotype specimen is known from the Horsethief Member of the Horseshoe Canyon Formation, which dates to the Maastrichtian age, and ranges from around 72.2–71.5 million years ago. Assigned teeth from other parts of the formation indicate it survived for over 2 million years and across a wide geographic area.

== Discovery ==
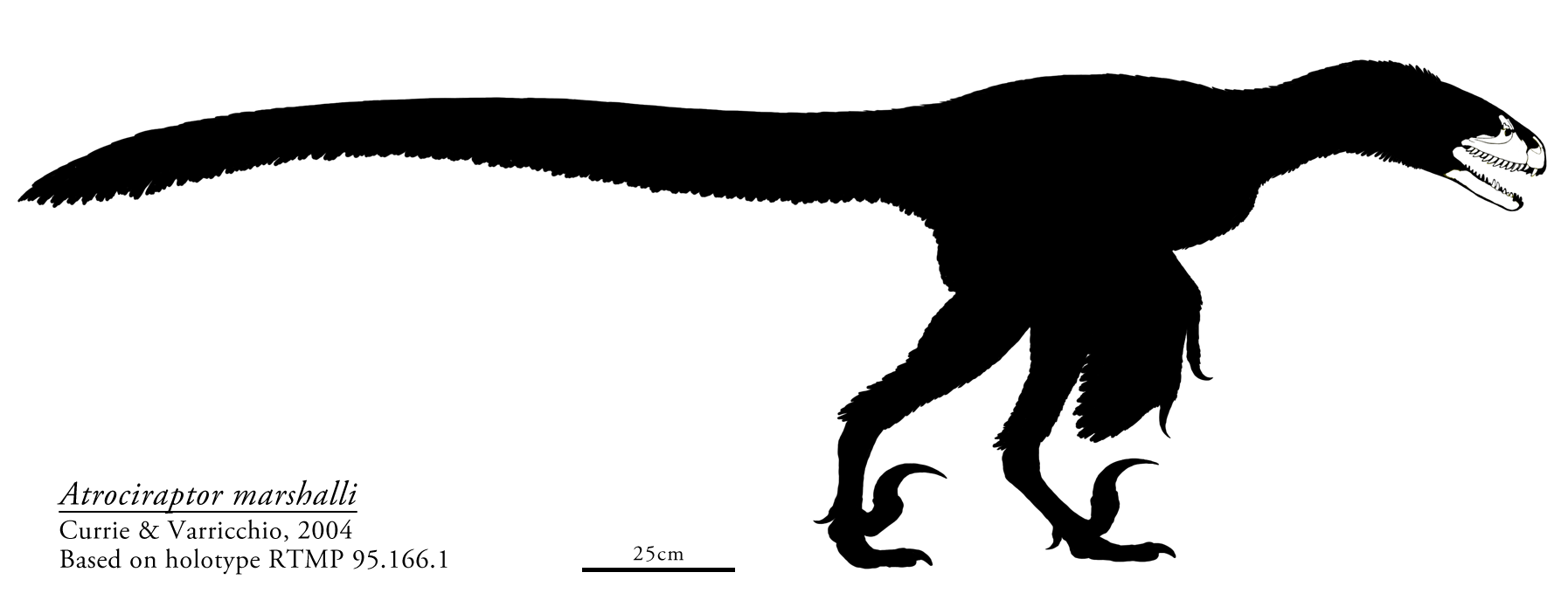
Skeletal diagram showing the position of the holotype jaw remains

In 1995, the part-time fossil collector Wayne Marshall discovered a partial skull of a dromaeosaurid (commonly called "raptor") dinosaur in the Horseshoe Canyon Formation of Drumheller in Alberta, Canada, about 5 km (3 mi) west of the Royal Tyrrell Museum of Palaeontology. Marshall had previously worked in the museum's mounting shop, helping to construct exhibits until the museum opened in 1985, and reported fossils to museum staff as he found them over the years. Jaw fragments and teeth eroding from the hillside led to the discovery of the dromaeosaur specimen; Marshall collected the loose fossil fragments and delivered them to the palaeontologist Philip J. Currie at the museum, and the remaining parts were later collected. Much of the specimen was in a relatively hard block of sandstone, and preparation revealed the right maxilla (main bone of the upper jaw) exposed in outer side-view and the right dentary (tooth-bearing bone of the lower jaw) exposed in inner side view, and both of these bones were left in the block.

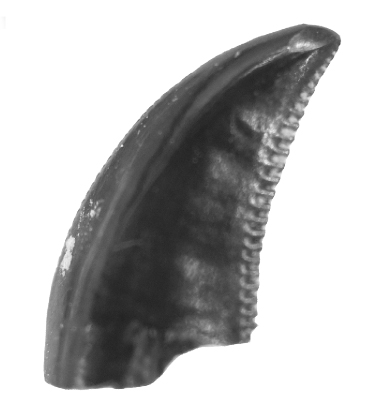
Assigned tooth

In 2004, Currie and the palaeontologist David Varricchio made the specimen (catalogued as RTMP 95.166.1) the holotype of the new genus and species Atrociraptor marshalli. The generic name is derived from the Latin words atrox, which means 'savage', and raptor, 'robber'. The specific name references Marshall, the discoverer, and the full name can be translated as "Marshall's savage robber". Since then, Marshall has led the museum staff to many important finds. In all, the holotype preserves both premaxillae (frontmost bone of the upper jaw, freed from the rock matrix), a right maxilla, both dentaries (the left one is incomplete), associated teeth (some having fallen out of their sockets prior to fossilisation), and numerous bone fragments from the skull. The specimen was not fully prepared by the time of its original description, so in 2022, the palaeontologist Mark J. Powers and colleagues used computed tomography to visualise further details of the skull. Numerous isolated teeth from the Horseshoe Canyon Formation (some of which had originally been assigned to Saurornitholestes) have since been assigned to Atrociraptor. Some of these were found in a bonebed in Dry Island Buffalo Jump Provincial Park, which also preserves multiple Albertosaurus individuals.

Atrociraptor was featured in the 2022 film Jurassic World Dominion, with the director describing it as more "brutish" than Velociraptor as it appears in the film. A /Film writer commented that while Atrociraptor "might sound like another made-up hybrid dinosaur invented for the Jurassic World films ... it's a very real dino with its own Wiki page and everything".

== Description ==
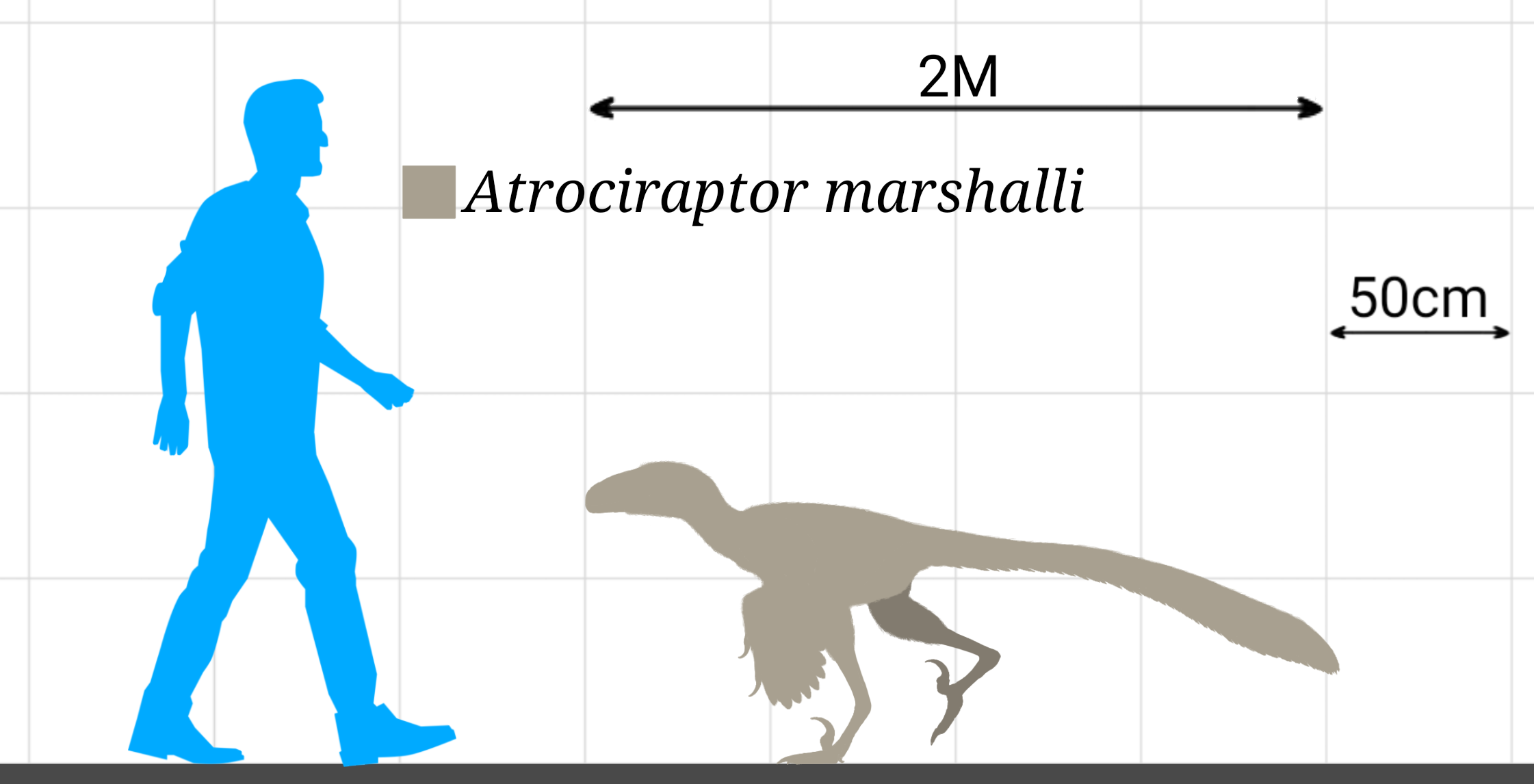
Size compared to a human

Atrociraptor was a relatively small dromaeosaurid, comparable to Velociraptor in size, and is estimated to have measured about 1.8–2 m (5.9–6.6 ft) in length and weighed 15 kg (33 lb). As a dromaeosaur, it would have had large arms, a long tail with vertebrae encased in rod-like extensions, and a large sickle-claw on the robust, hyper-extendible second toe. Fossils of other dromaeosaurids, such as Zhenyuanlong, show that even relatively large members of the group had pennaceous feathers, with large wings on the arms and long feathers on the tail. Atrociraptor does not have autapomorphies (unique diagnostic features) that can be used to distinguish it, but it has a unique combination of features that is so far unknown in relatives. Atrociraptor mainly differs from its contemporary relatives Bambiraptor, Saurornitholestes, and Velociraptor in that its face is much deeper, and in that its maxillary teeth are more strongly inclined backwards than in most other dromaeosaurids, and in the teeth being almost all the same size.

The relatively deep premaxillae have four teeth each, the same number as in other dromaeosaurids. The part of the premaxilla below the nostril is taller than long from front to back, as in Deinonychus, Utahraptor, and perhaps Dromaeosaurus, while the opposite is the case for Bambiraptor, Saurornitholestes, and Velociraptor. There is an elongated extension below the nostril, the subnarial process, that is wedged between the nasal bone and the maxilla, as in other dromaeosaurids. The almost parallel subnarial and internarial (above the nostrils) processes are oriented more upwards than hindwards due to the depth of the snout, unlike in other dromaeosaurids where the opposite is true. The shallow depression on the side of the premaxilla that marks the lower front limit of the nostril opening is nested between the subnarial and internarial processes, while it extends further to the front in Velociraptor.

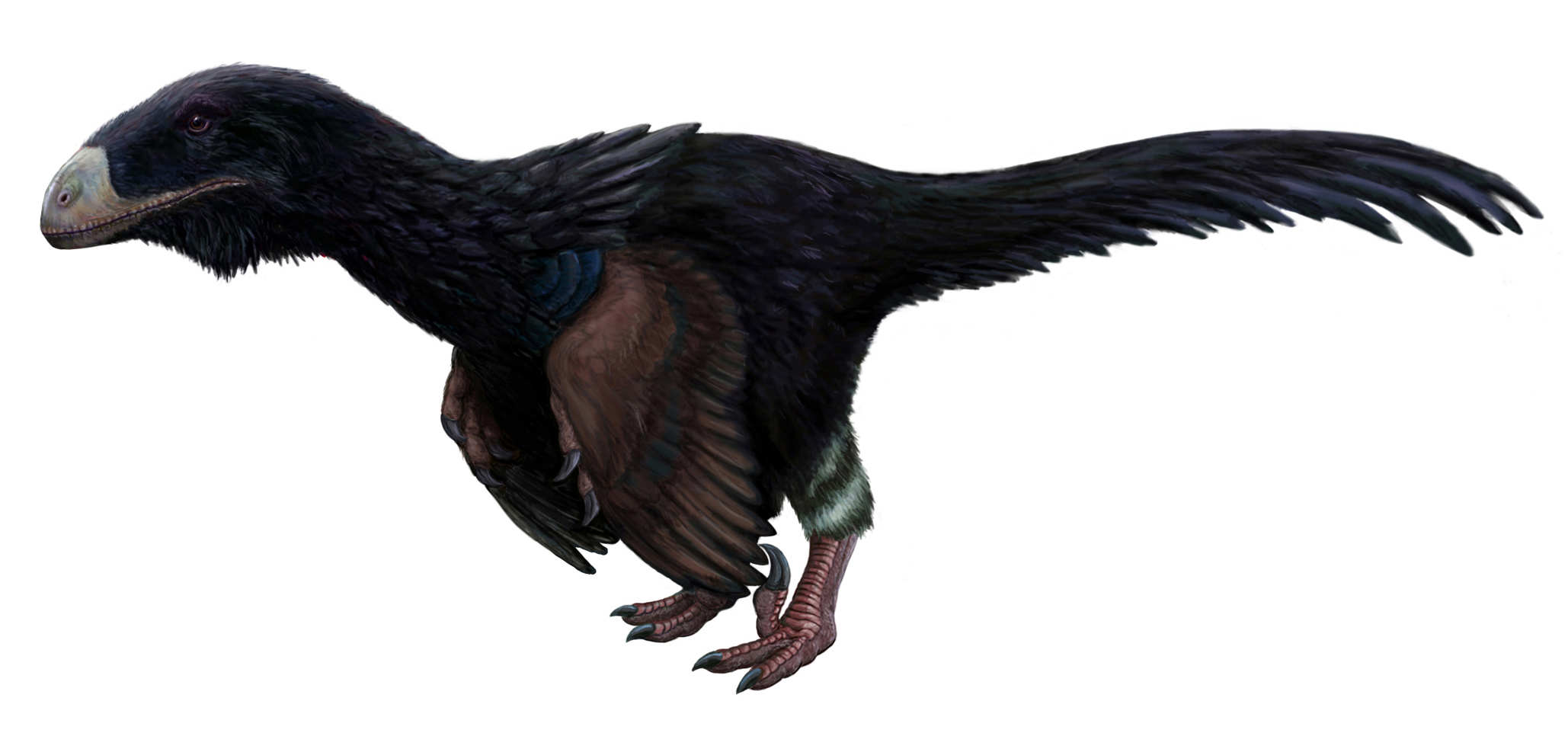
Hypothetical life restoration with body and plumage based on related dromaeosaurids

The second tooth of the premaxilla is the largest of the four therein, based on the size of the tooth sockets, as in some relatives. As in Saurornitholestes, the front cutting edge is on the inner hind edge of the tooth, but more forwards positioned than the hind cutting edge. The teeth look more J-shaped than D-shaped in cross section. The serrations on the front and hind cutting edges of the premaxillary teeth have almost the same basal diameter, though those on the front are taller. There are 2.3–3.0 serrations per 1 mm (0.04 in).

The promaxillary fenestra, an opening in the front of the antorbital fossa (a depression around the antorbital fenestra, the large opening in front of the eye), is positioned right under the maxillary fenestra, another opening. In relatives where both these fenestrae are known, the promaxillary fenestra is well in front of and below the maxillary fenestra. The maxilla is roughly triangular and relatively deeper than in other dromaeosaurids. The height between the maxillary fenestra and the tooth-bearing margin of the maxilla is more than twice the height of the largest tooth in Atrociraptor, whereas it is less than twice that in other dromaeosaurids. If the teeth can be assumed to have had the same relative height among dromaeosaurids, the short and deep appearance of the maxilla of Atrociraptor could be due to the snout having an increased depth rather than because the snout was shortened.

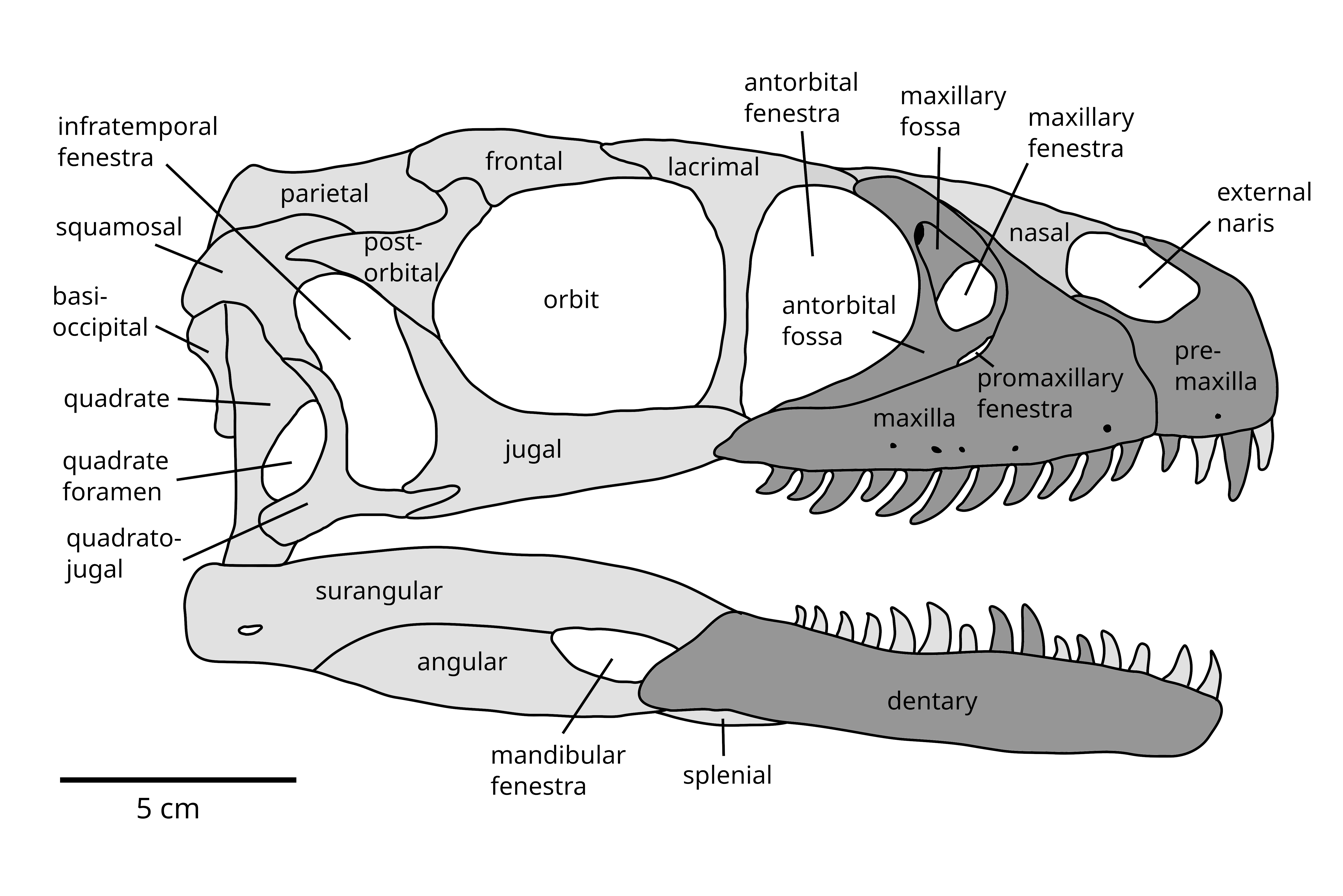
Annotated skull diagram of Atrociraptor; the dark grey premaxilla, maxilla, and dentary are known (bones in light grey are reconstructed).

The antorbital fenestra of Atrociraptor was relatively small compared to in other dromaeosaurids, with the portion in the maxilla taking up less than 43% its length, and the antorbital fossa also appears to have been relatively smaller. The rounded maxillary fenestra is larger than in relatives, and had a diameter of about 1 cm (0.4 in) when complete. In front of a depression on the side at the back of the maxilla, the margin of the antorbital fossa slopes forwards and up at a higher angle than in other dromaeosaurids. Right above the margin of the tooth sockets, the maxilla has a row of neurovascular foramina (which supplied blood). The lower margin of the maxilla is strongly convex when seen from the side.

The maxilla contains eleven teeth (comparable to most other dromaeosaurids), which are closely packed in their sockets with no gaps between them. The maxillary teeth are narrow from side to side, blade-like, and have a distinct inclination towards the back and down; only the teeth of Bambiraptor and Deinonychus are similarly inclined. The maxillary dentition is almost isodont (the teeth being of similar size), and, unusually for dromaeosurids, there are no gaps left by shed teeth in the holotype. The teeth vary little in overall height, while in Velociraptor every other tooth is noticeably longer than those next to it. The maxillary teeth have larger serrations on their hind cutting edge, 3–4.5 per mm, than their front, 5–8 per mm. The serrations on the hind edge have relatively straight shafts with hooked tips, and are taller than the serrations at the front. The front and hind cutting edges lie on the midline of the maxillary teeth like in relatives but unlike Dromaeosaurus, and the teeth are generally comparable to those of Bambiraptor, Deinonychus, Saurornitholestes, and Velociraptor.

The dentary of Atrociraptor is similar to those of other dromaeosaurids. The upper and lower margins are almost parallel, though the height decreases somewhat towards the back of the tooth-bearing part. The external mandibular fenestra (an opening at the side of the lower jaw) appears to have been small and set low as in relatives, and the dentary has two rows of nutritive foramina. The dentary is thin from side to side, the Meckelian canal is shallow, the dental shelf narrow, and the dental plates are fused to each other and to the dentary's margin, as in relatives. The complete number of tooth sockets in the dentary is unknown; there are ten sockets in the right dentary and six in the left. The complete number is estimated to have been twelve or thirteen. The teeth of the dentary appear to be generally smaller than those in the maxilla, and they are not as strongly inclined backwards. Like the maxillary teeth, they are narrow and as blade-like. The serrations at the front are smaller and more numerous, 5–8 per mm, than those behind, 3.5–5.

== Classification ==
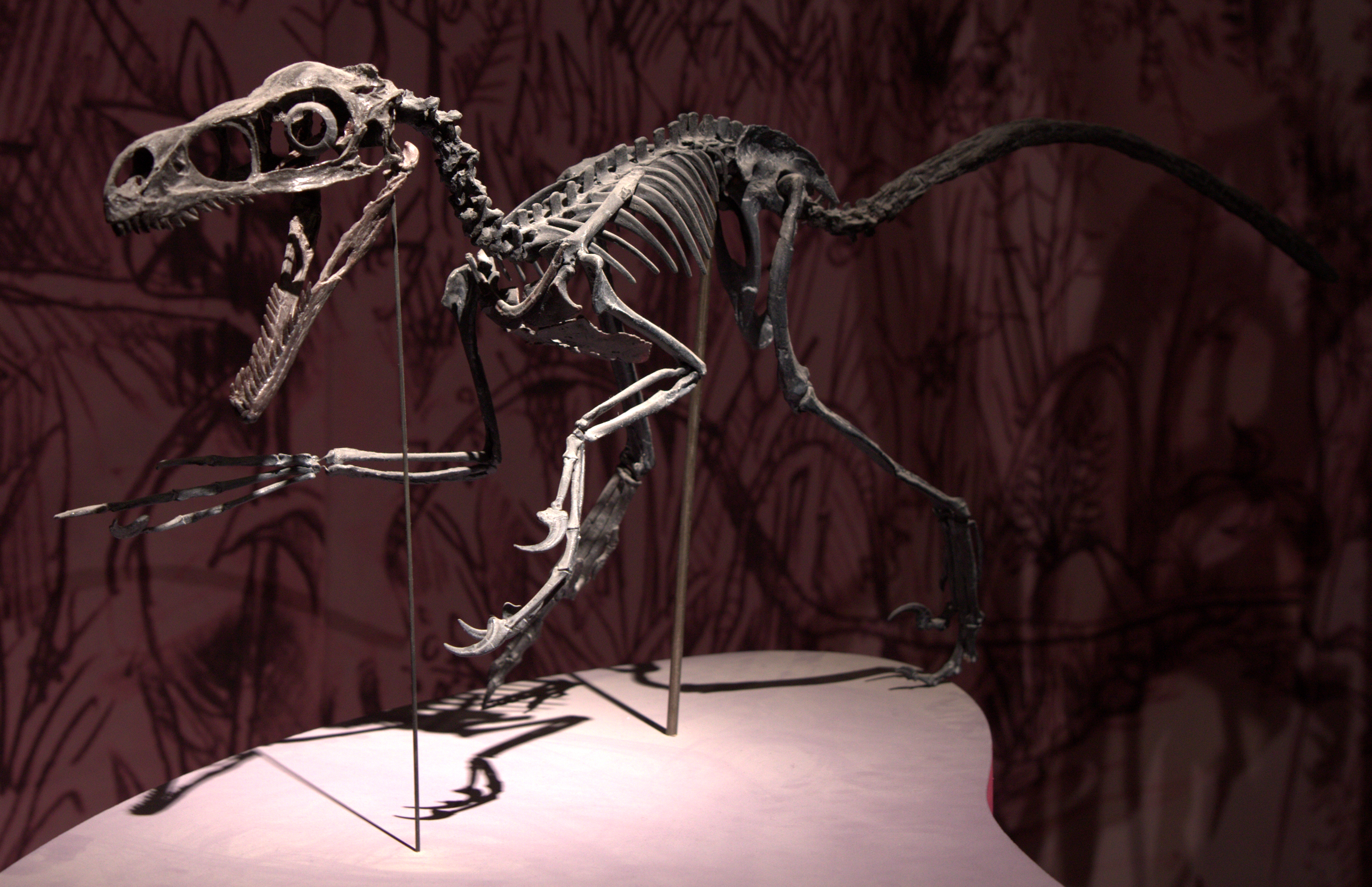
Reconstructed skeleton of the related Bambiraptor, a fellow member of Saurornitholestinae

Within Dromaeosauridae, Atrociraptor is a member of Eudromaeosauria (or "true dromaeosaurids"), a group that includes the subfamilies Saurornitholestinae, Velociraptorinae, and Dromaeosaurinae. Below is a cladogram showing the position of Eudromaeosauria within Dromaeosauridae.

- Dromaeosauridae
  - Halszkaraptorinae
  - - Unenlagiinae
    - - Microraptoria
      - Eudromaeosauria

The pattern of eudromaeosaur dispersal is controversial among scientists. Some researchers have suggested that saurornitholestines are the earliest-diverging members of this group. If that is the case, it suggests a North American origin for Eudromaeosauria. However, if saurornitholestines are more closely related to velociraptorines, then they may have immigrated to North America from Asia closer to the end of the Cretaceous. The general uncertainty of the internal classification of Eudromaeosauria complicates discussion of the placement of Atrociraptor. This is compounded by the incompleteness of the known remains (four skull bones and several teeth). The skull and teeth of Atrociraptor bear similarities to many dromaeosaur taxa including Dromaeosaurus, Shri, Saurornitholestes, and Kuru. For this reason, some studies fully omit Atrociraptor from the presentation of their findings in order to improve the clarity of the interrelationships they found in their phylogenetic analyses.

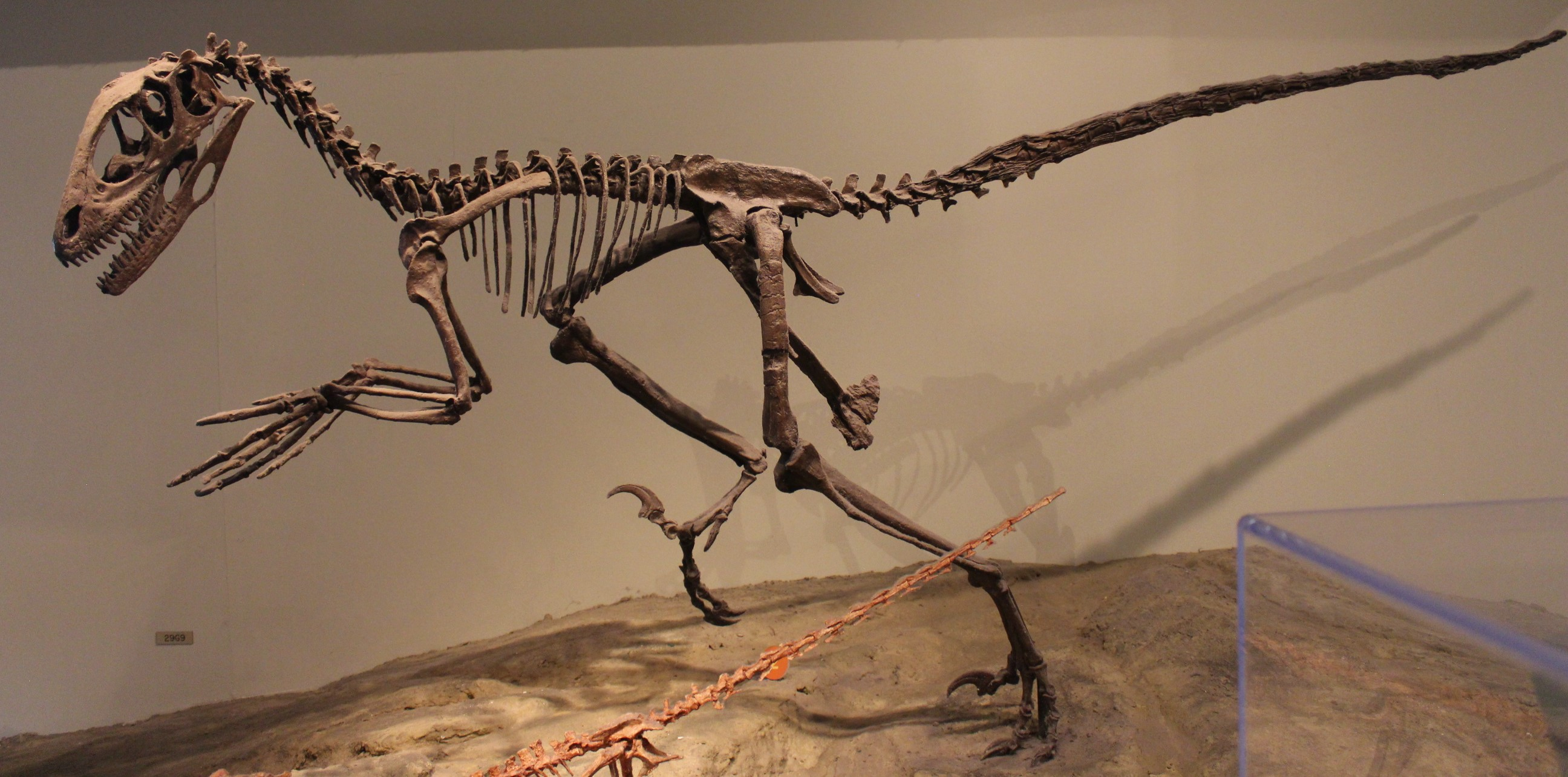
Reconstructed skeleton of Deinonychus, which is sometimes considered closely related

When Atrociraptor was first described in 2004, it was found to be closely related to Deinonychus and assigned to the dromaeosaurid subfamily Velociraptorinae, a group known predominantly from the Late Cretaceous of Asia. This was based on the difference in size between the front and back serrations on the maxillary teeth and the size of the second premaxillary tooth. The describers cautioned that this position might change if more fossil material was found. A 2009 analysis by the palaeontologist Nicholas Longrich and Currie instead grouped Atrociraptor with Saurornitholestes as part of a new subfamily: Saurornitholestinae. By 2012, the palaeontologist Alan H. Turner and colleagues stated that the three phylogenetic analyses featuring Atrociraptor so far had such disparate results that there was no consensus regarding its affinity to other dromaeosaurids.

In their 2013 description of Acheroraptor, the palaeontologist David Evans and colleagues suggested that Atrociraptor was the sister taxon of the much older genus Deinonychus in a clade more advanced than Saurornitholestinae but outside of both Velociraptorinae and Dromaeosaurinae. This analysis used the same phylogenetic data set as the earlier analysis by Longrich and Currie, but included additional taxa which had been described in the interim. The analysis that accompanied the 2015 description of Dakotaraptor by the palaeontologist Robert DePalma and colleagues suggested that Atrociraptor was a member of Dromaeosaurinae, alongside Deinonychus, although they did not directly comment on the placement of Atrociraptor in their analysis. A similar result to DePalma and colleagues was found by the palaeontologists William and Kristen Parsons later in 2015.

By the 2020s, dromaeosaurid systematics included several unique phylogenetic datasets which have produced slightly different results. One of these datasets is the so-called "TWiG matrix" (an abbreviation for the Theropod Working Group), developed by the palaeontologists Steven Brusatte, Andrea Cau, Mark Norell, and several other researchers, which contains data for most named coelurosaurian taxa and is updated regularly by new authors. Other matrices include the matrix published by Mark Powers, the one published by Scott Hartman and colleagues, and one produced by Philip Currie and David Evans. In many of the most updated analyses for each of these matrices, including data from recently described taxa, Atrociraptor has been consistently found to be a member of Saurornitholestinae.

The results of two analyses, displaying two of the possible hypotheses of the affinities of Atrociraptor, are shown below.

Evans, Larson, & Currie 2013

- Eudromaeosauria
  - Saurornitholestinae
    - Bambiraptor
    - Saurornitholestes
  - - - Atrociraptor
      - Deinonychus
    - - Dromaeosaurinae
        - Achillobator
        - Balaur
        - Dromaeosaurus
        - Utahraptor
      - Velociraptorinae
        - Bayan Shireh taxon
        - - Acheroraptor
          - - Velociraptor mongoliensis
            - - Adasaurus
              - Tsaagan
              - "Velociraptor" osmolskae

Czepiński 2023

- Eudromaeosauria
  - Adasaurus
  - - Velociraptorinae
      - Kuru
      - - - Shri
          - Velociraptor mongoliensis
          - Velociraptor sp. (MPC-D 100/982)
        - - "Velociraptor" osmolskae
          - - Linheraptor
            - Tsaagan
    - - Dromaeosaurinae
        - Utahraptor
        - - Achillobator
          - Dromaeosaurus
      - Saurornitholestinae
        - Deinonychus
        - - Bambiraptor
          - Saurornitholestes
          - - Acheroraptor
            - Atrociraptor

== Palaeobiology ==
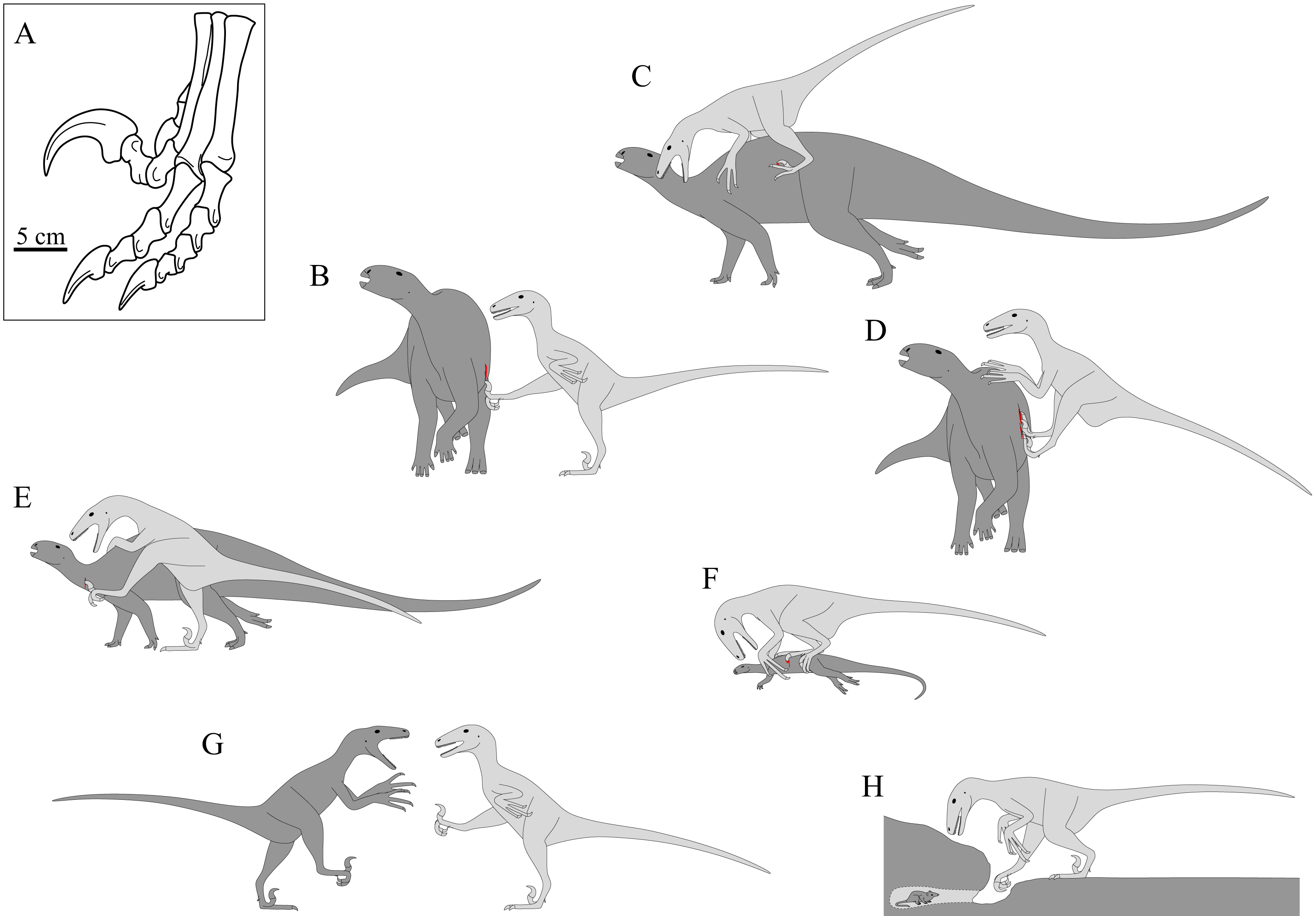
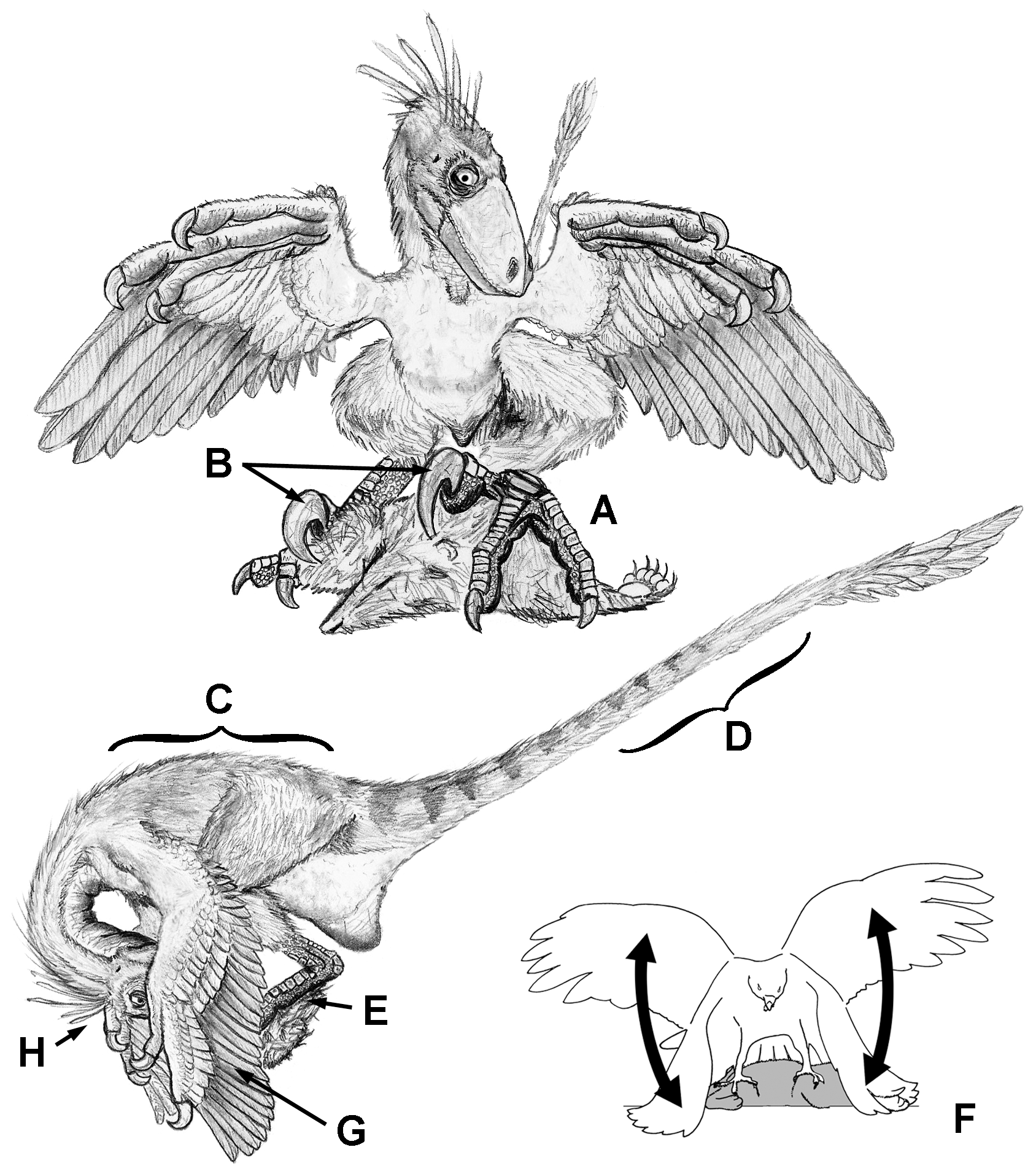
Illustrations of various hypotheses for how dromaeosaurids used their sickle-claws (left, feathers omitted for clarity), and of the "Raptor Prey Restraint" model, a hypothesis supported by 21st century studies (right)

The palaeontologist Gregory S. Paul suggested in 2016 that Atrociraptor was able to attack relatively large prey and to wound it more than its relatives with its strong head and teeth. Powers and colleagues noted in 2022 that all dromaeosaurids with their deep maxillae are considered to have been predators, based on their relatively large size, few yet large serrated teeth, recurved claws including their sickle-claws, and a very developed olfactory system (sense of smell). The development of deep snouts in addition was probably an adaptation for handling vertebrate prey; velociraptorines with their elongated snouts that allowed for rapid biting at the cost of power perhaps specialised in smaller prey in their desert environments, and the small-bodied Acheroraptor and Saurornitholestes with their intermediate snout dimensions may have had more generalised diets in their more diverse ecosystems. The diverse and abundant prey in the environments of Atrociraptor and Deinonychus may have allowed for more specialised diets of large-bodied prey for these deep-snouted dromaeosaurids.

Dromaeosaurids are thought to have used the large sickle-claws on their second toes to deal with prey, and theories about how this was done have ranged from using the claws for slashing to climbing up prey larger than themselves. A 2011 study by the palaeontologist Denver W. Fowler and colleagues found these ideas unlikely, and instead suggested the claws were used like those of modern birds of prey, to grip and pin down prey, and immobilise it while dismembering it with the mouth. Fowler and colleagues called this the "Raptor Prey Restraint" model, and added that the grasping feet showed a shift to using the feet instead of the hands for restraining prey, as the forelimbs became increasingly feathered. The forelimbs could instead have been used for "stability flapping" as seen in birds of prey, which, along with movement of the tail, would have helped the predator stay in position when struggling with the prey. In 2019, the palaeontologist Peter J. Bishop examined the biomechanics of dromaeosaurid sickle-claws through a musculoskeletal 3D model of the hindlimb of Deinonychus. The results supported that the claws were used for grasping and restraining prey smaller than the dromaeosaurid itself, but did not rule out other behaviours also involving crouching, such as stabbing and cutting prey at close quarters.

== Palaeoecology ==
=== Palaeoenvironment ===
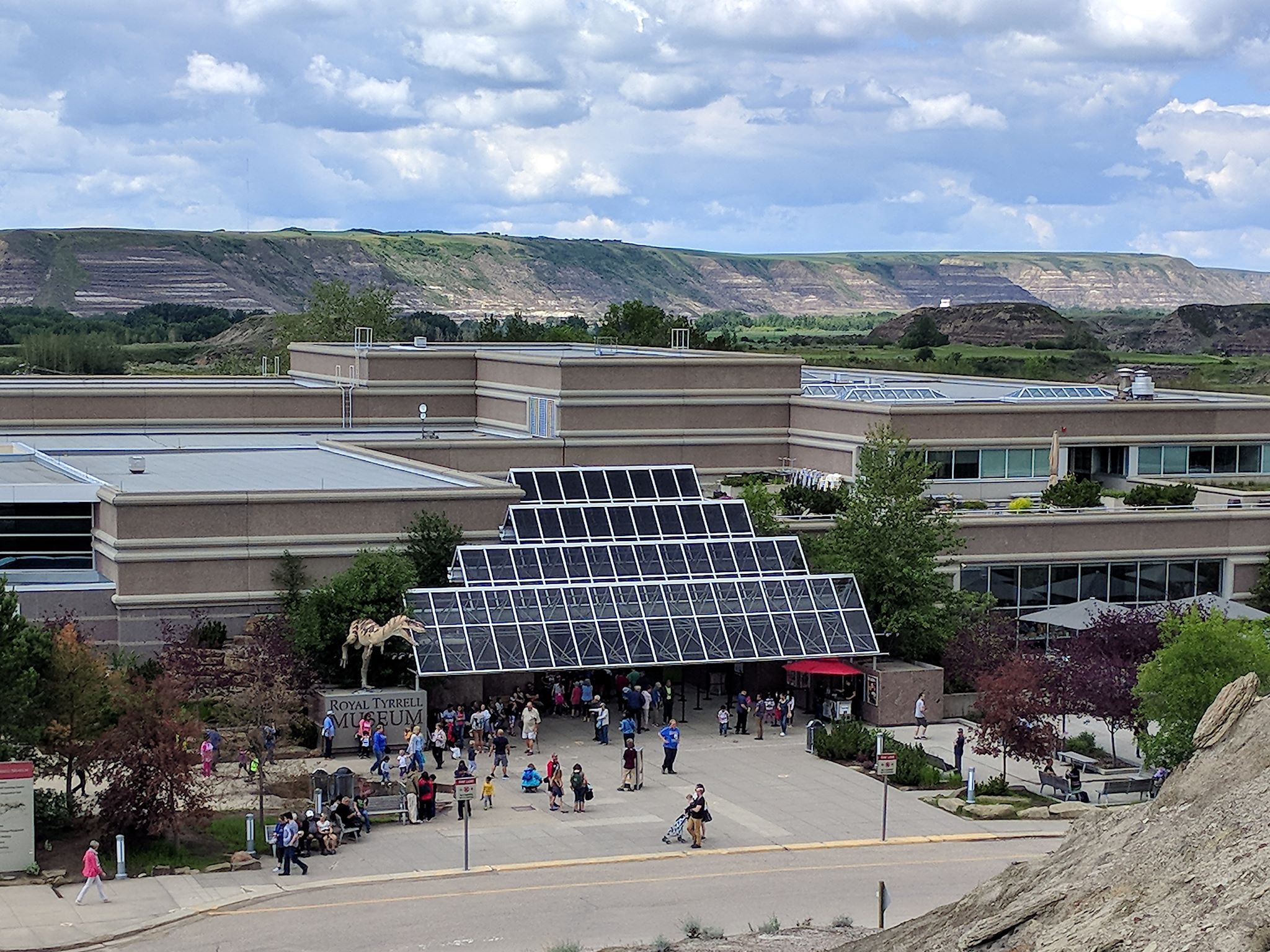
The holotype was discovered about 5 km (3 mi) west of the Royal Tyrrell Museum of Palaeontology.

The holotype remains of Atrociraptor were found at a locality west of the Royal Tyrrell Museum of Palaeontology. This locality is part of the Horsethief Member of the Horseshoe Canyon Formation, which is the second-oldest member of the formation. The Horsethief Member ranges from around 72.2–71.5 million years ago, a timespan of about 700,000 years. Teeth from elsewhere in the Horseshoe Canyon Formation have been assigned to Atrociraptor. If these assignments are valid, it would mean Atrociraptor had a wide geographic and temporal distribution. These remains push the latest occurrence of Atrociraptor to the Tolman Member of the formation (about 70.9–69.6 million years ago), suggesting the genus may have existed for over 2 million years.

In the early Maastrichtian, the continent of Laramidia (today North America) was about 8 degrees of latitude further North than North America is today. Despite this, the average temperature of the area was almost certainly much warmer than the region is today. The mean annual temperature in the early Maastrichtian is estimated to have been around 10 °C (50 °F), compared to 4.5 °C (40.1 °F) today. The lower part of the Horseshoe Canyon Formation, where the holotype was discovered, corresponds to poorly-drained sediments which reflect a depositional setting with a lot of standing water. The sediments of the Horsethief Member are composed primarily of coal, shales, sandstones, and mudstones. These sediments are rich with organic materials, which reflect a highly saturated and humid environment, likely a coastal plain or fluvial system which was on the margins of the Western Interior Seaway. This suggests that the region was very humid and composed primarily of wetlands with a high water table. This is further corroborated by the presence of a wider variety of turtles in the lower members of the formation than in the higher members.

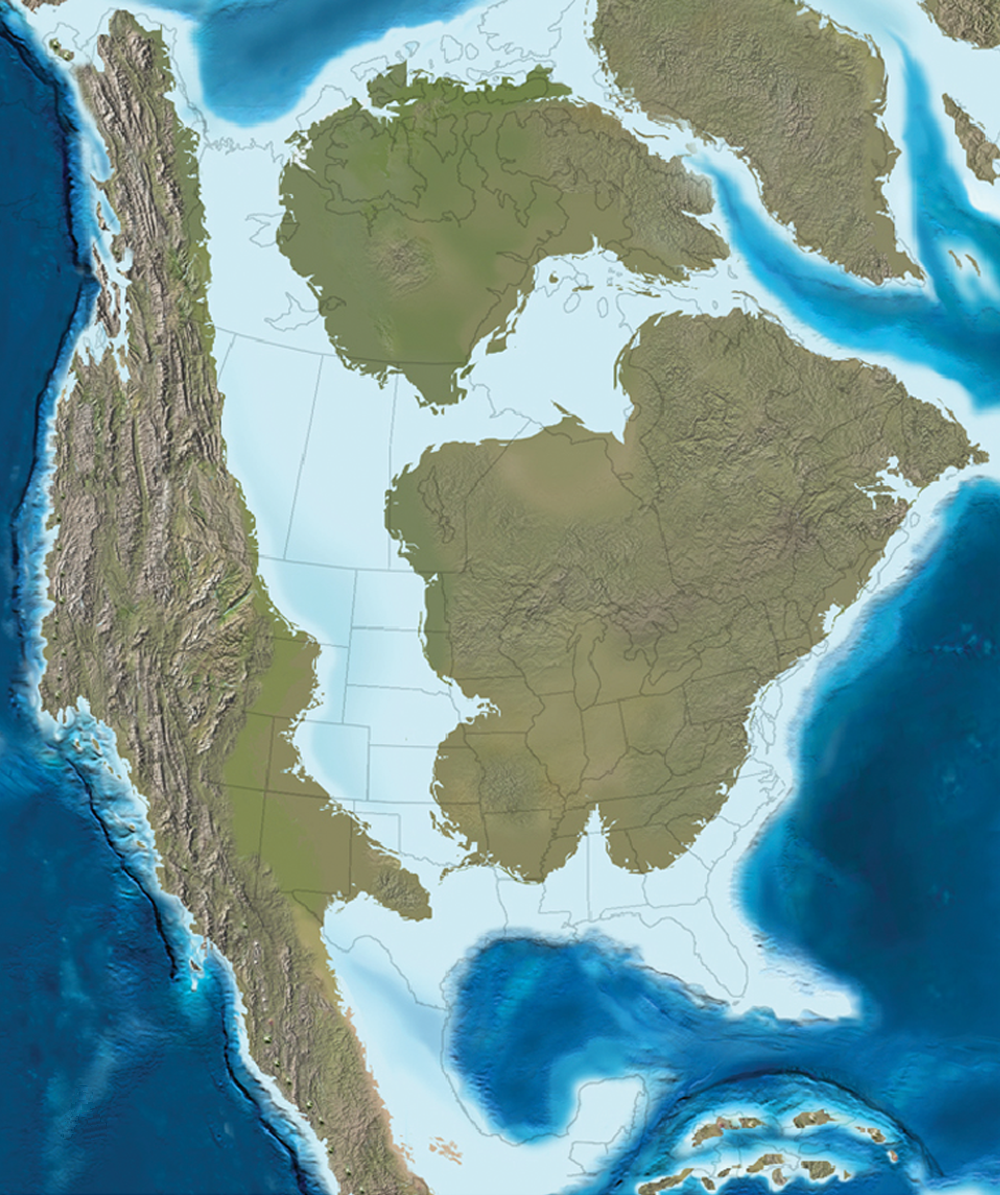
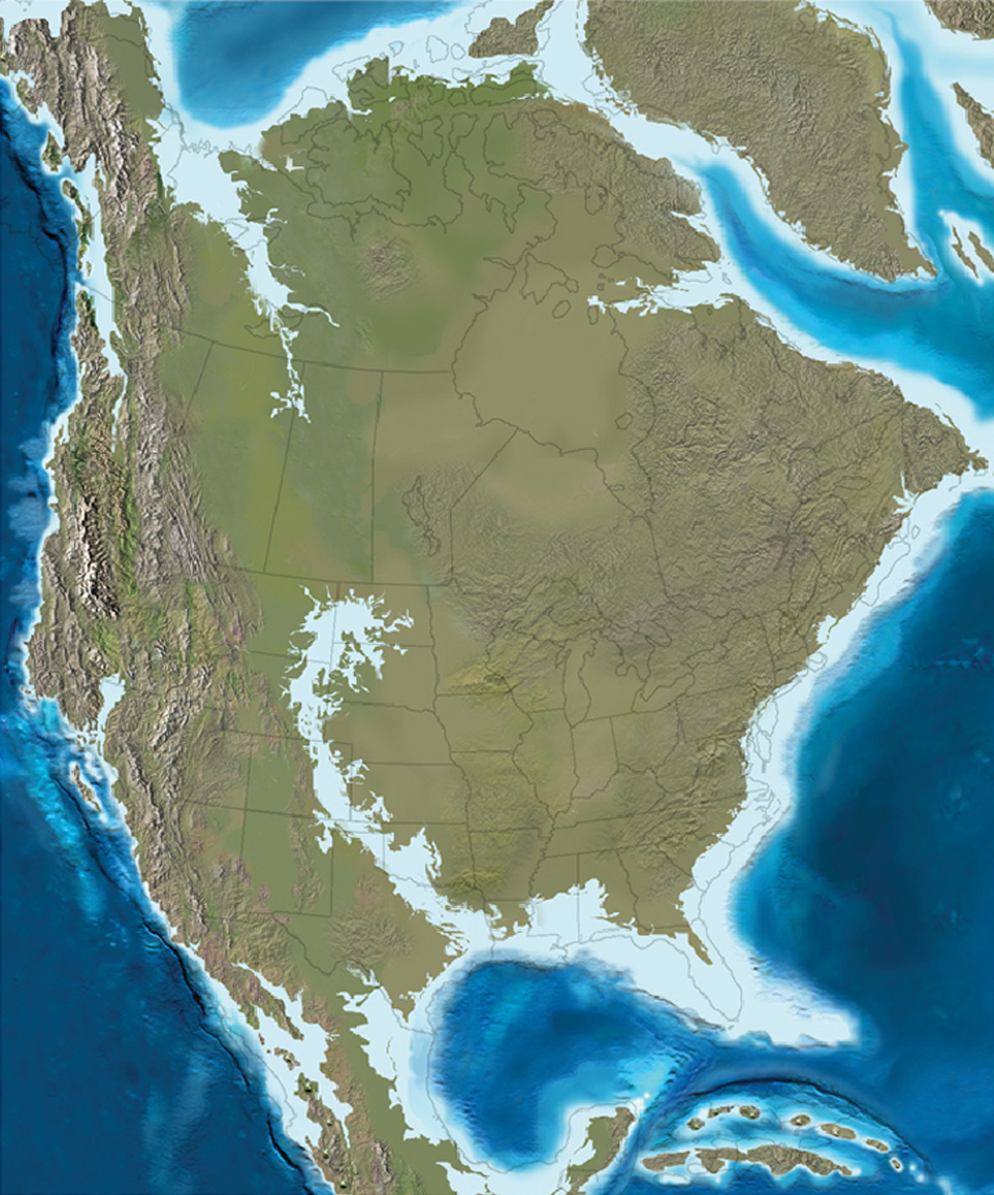
Maps of North America from the Campanian (left) and the Maastrichtian (right) showing the fall in sea levels between 75 and 66 Ma

As the Maastrichtian stage progressed, the Western Interior Seaway began to shrink, which is reflected in the palaeoclimatic reconstructions of the region. Later sediments are believed to have been further inland and less humid than those of the late Campanian. This may be responsible for the apparent change in fauna during this period. How these climatic changes affected Atrociraptor is not clear, due to the rarity of its remains, but the discovery of teeth from the geologically younger Tolman Member suggests that the taxon may have survived through this period. Despite the apparent decline in temperature and humidity, it is known that major flooding events continued throughout this period. The Albertosaurus bonebed which contains teeth referred to Atrociraptor, dated to one of the upper members of the Horseshoe Canyon Formation, was believed to have been deposited during a major storm. Despite the regression of the Western Interior Seaway, Cretaceous Alberta became wetter and more humid in the uppermost part of the formation (around 68 million years ago), returning to conditions similar to those of the Horsethief Member. No remains from these youngest sediments have been assigned to Atrociraptor, which suggests that either the change in climate forced the small theropod to move elsewhere or it became extinct.

=== Contemporary fauna and flora ===
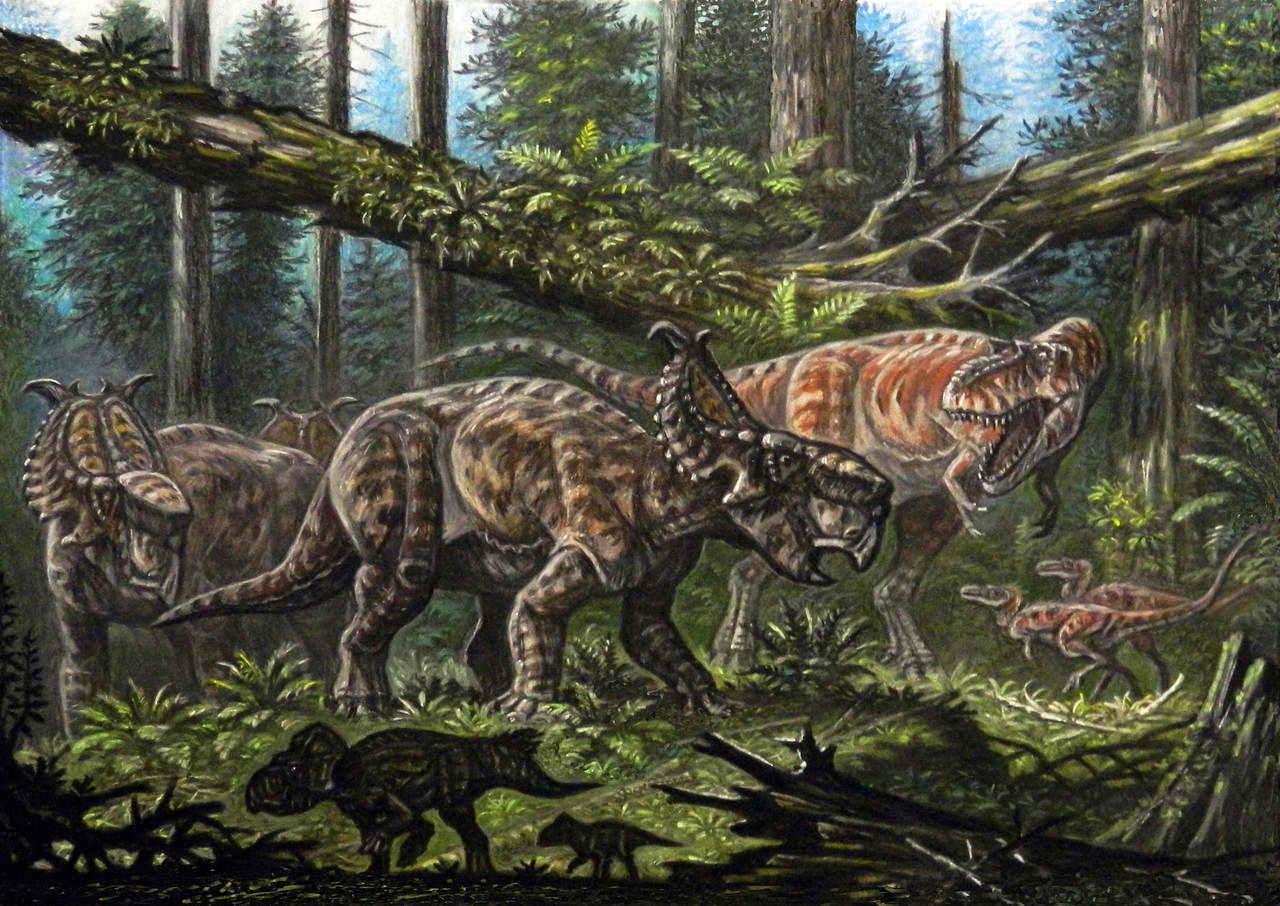
Hypothetical restoration of various dinosaurs known from the Horsethief Member of the Horseshoe Canyon Formation, where the first Atrociraptor specimen was found

The holotype of Atrociraptor is the only fossil discovered from its locality, so it is not known for certain if any of the animals from the Horsethief Member directly coexisted with it, but many of them are known to have been contemporaneous. The Horsethief Member of the Horseshoe Canyon Formation constitutes the upper part of the so-called Edmontosaurus regalis-Pachyrhinosaurus canadensis zone. As the name suggests, two common terrestrial herbivores in these lower strata were Pachyrhinosaurus and Edmontosaurus. The lower part of Horseshoe Canyon also preserves fossils of other ceratopsids including Anchiceratops, Arrhinoceratops, and several indeterminate specimens. Ankylosaurs are also well-represented in this member. The genera Edmontonia and Anodontosaurus have been found alongside indeterminate ankylosaur remains. Hadrosaurid remains are very common, but many of these are not confidently assigned to any genera other than Edmontosaurus. Fragmentary remains of pachycephalosaurids have also been found.

Theropod remains are also common in the Horsethief Member. Ornithomimus and Struthiomimus are known from several specimens, and other coelurosaurs are known from a few remains. These include the troodontid Albertavenator and the caenagnathids Apatoraptor and Epichirostenotes. Although their remains are not known directly from the Horsethief Member, Dromaeosaurus, Paronychodon, and the poorly-understood taxon Richardoestesia (known only from teeth) are known from both older and younger deposits, so they are inferred to have existed at this time as well. The largest theropod in the Horsethief Member (and the Horseshoe Canyon Formation generally) was the tyrannosaurid Albertosaurus.

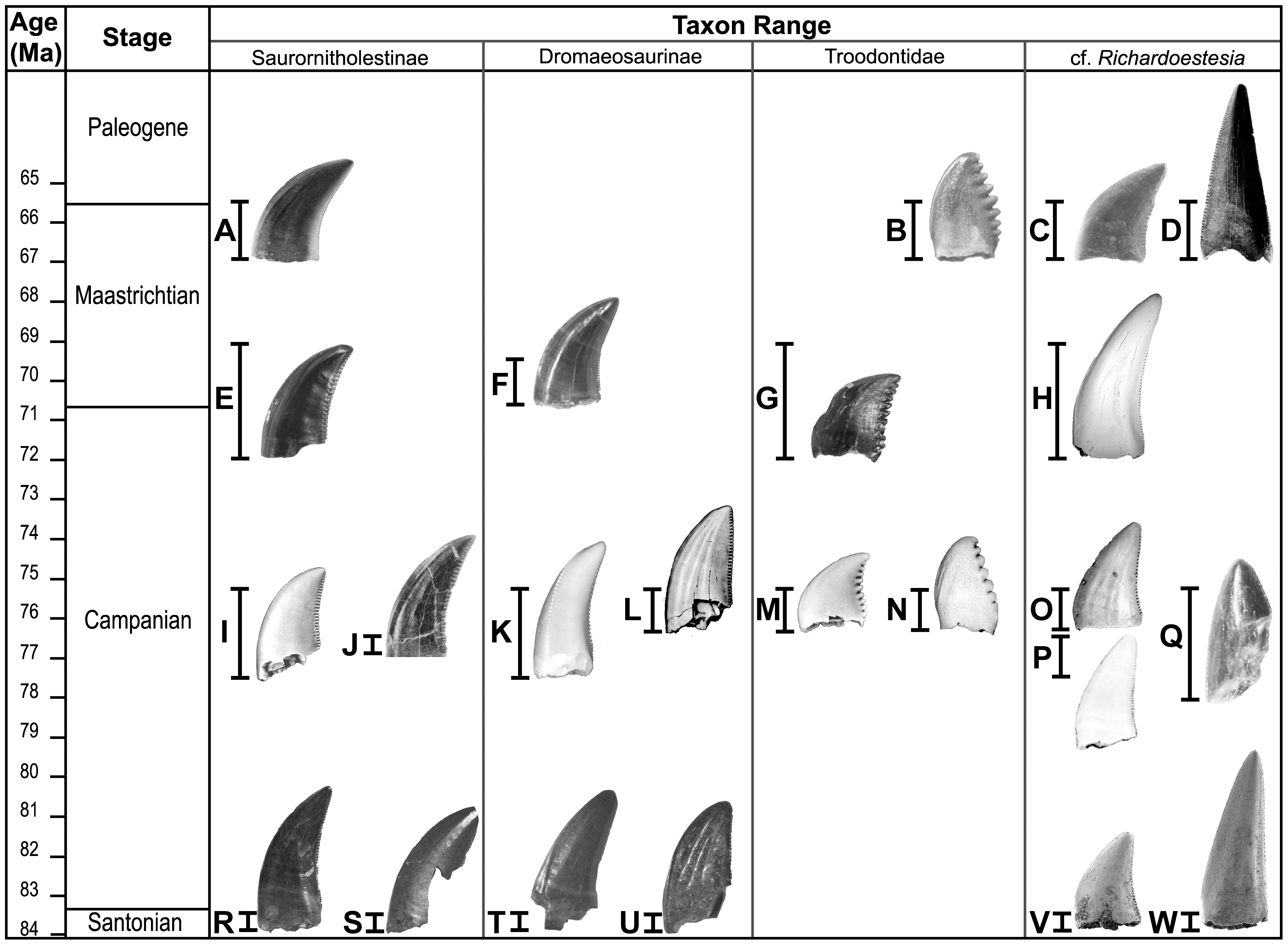
Tooth assigned to Atrociraptor (E, middle left) among those of other small theropods, with bars indicating their stratigraphic ranges

Teeth found in the higher layers of the Horseshoe Canyon Formation (the Morrin and Tolman members) suggest that Atrociraptor may have also been a constituent of the younger Hypacrosaurus altispinus-Saurolophus osborni zone. This period is typified by the presence of the hadrosaurids Saurolophus and Hypacrosaurus, in addition to numerous hadrosaur remains that have not yet been assigned to a particular genus. This time interval extended from 71.5–69.6 million years ago and immediately followed the Edmontosaurus regalis-Pachyrhinosaurus canadensis dinosaur zone. Edmontosaurus, Pachyrhinosaurus, and Edmontonia that characterise the Horsethief Member appear to be completely absent from this zone, although these genera did persist elsewhere in Laramidia. The ceratopsids Anchiceratops and Arrhinoceratops persist into the Morrin Member and the early layers of the even younger Tolman Member, as does the ankylosaurid Anodontosaurus and the large predator Albertosaurus.

The aforementioned teeth, which have been assigned to Atrociraptor, suggest that it directly shared its environment in the Tolman Member with Albertosaurus, Hypacrosaurus, one or more troodontids, ornithomimids, and possibly other dromaeosaurids. Small dinosaurs are also more common in the Tolman Member. These include the leptoceratopsid Montanoceratops, the pachycephalosaurid Sphaerotholus, the thescelosaurid Parksosaurus, and the alvarezsaurid Albertonykus, in addition to the diverse assemblage of small theropods known from the Horsethief Member. The absence of these fossils from the older members does not necessarily mean that these taxa did not exist at that time, and may simply be reflective of the fossil bias which makes the preservation of small-bodied animals less likely.

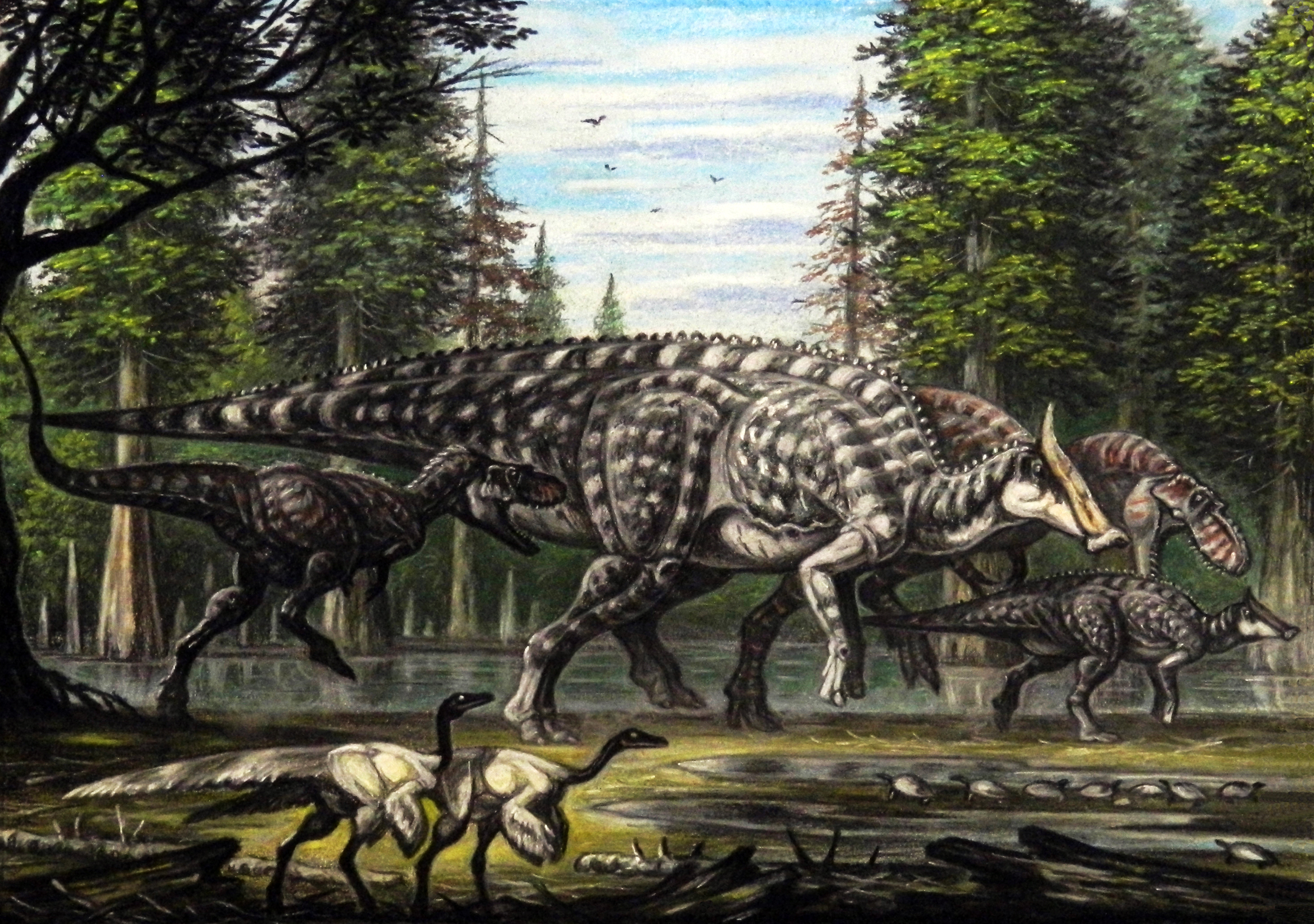
Hypothetical restoration of various dinosaurs from the Tolman Member of the Horseshoe Canyon Formation, where assigned Atrociraptor teeth have been found

Remains of animals other than dinosaurs are known from throughout the Horseshoe Canyon Formation. Fish are common fossils and are represented by sclerorhynchoids, guitarfish, sturgeons, paddlefishes, aspidorhynchids, osteoglossomorphs, elopiformes, ellimmichthyiformes, esocids, and acanthomorphs. Frogs and salamanders are also known from teeth found in these deposits alongside polyglyphanodontian lizards. Turtles were also very diverse in the warm and humid climate of the early Maastrichtian. Fossils of macrobaenids, chelydrids, trionychids, adocids, and the giant genus Basilemys have been found from the parts of Horseshoe Canyon Formation that correspond to wetlands. The choristodere genus Champsosaurus was also a resident of Alberta during this time.

A wide variety of fossil plants have been found in the Horseshoe Canyon Formation. The most numerous and diverse of these are the conifers, which are known from plant body fossils and a diverse array of seeds. Among the conifers present were pines, redwoods, cypresses, yellow woods, and yews, as well as some conifers that have not been confidently identified by paleobotanists. Ginkgoes are also known from the region during the Cretaceous. Uniquely, fossils of true cycads – which are otherwise very abundant among Mesozoic flora – appear to be completely absent from the Horseshoe Canyon Formation. Seed ferns and false cycads, which are related groups of spermatophytes, have been found, and some plant remains that resemble the genus Nilssonia have been suggested to belong to true cycads.

Angiosperms had undergone a significant diversification event during the Cretaceous Terrestrial Revolution, and by the early Maastrichtian, they were common components of North American terrestrial ecosystems. However, in the Horseshoe Canyon Formation, leaf imprints, fossilized wood, stems, and fruits from angiosperms are rare fossils. Fossilized leaves and fruits of plane trees, dogwood trees, myrtles, wheel trees, saxifrages, and katsura have been identified. Most angiosperm remains so far discovered have been in the form of seeds and pollen. Such trace fossils from lotuses, laurels, hornworts, witch hazels, elm trees, buckthorns, beeches, birches, willows, and cashews, among others, have also been found, but body fossils from these plants are not yet known from the area.

Fossil remains from non-spermatophytes are rare, and typically only their spores are preserved. The morphology of these spores is used to determine the affinities of these plants. From this, it has been determined that the Horseshoe Canyon Formation was also home to a diverse assemblage of ferns, tree ferns, water clovers, horsetails, quillworts, club mosses, mosses, and liverworts.

== See also ==
- Dinosaurs in Jurassic Park
- List of North American dinosaurs
