= Garcorops =

Scientific classification
- Kingdom: Animalia
- Phylum: Arthropoda
- Subphylum: Chelicerata
- Class: Arachnida
- Order: Araneae
- Infraorder: Araneomorphae
- Family: Selenopidae
- Genus: Garcorops; Corronca, 2003

Type species
- G. madagascar Corronca, 2003

Species
- G. jocquei Corronca, 2003 – Comoros; G. madagascar Corronca, 2003 – Madagascar; G. paulyi Corronca, 2003 – Madagascar

Genus of spiders

Garcorops is a genus of east African wall spiders (family Selenopidae) first described by J. A. Corronca in 2003. As of September 2019, it contains three species found in Madagascar and Comoros: G. jocquei, G. madagascar, and G. paulyi. In addition, one species, †Garcorops jadis Bosselaers, 2004 , is only known from a fossil found discovered in copal on Madagascar.
