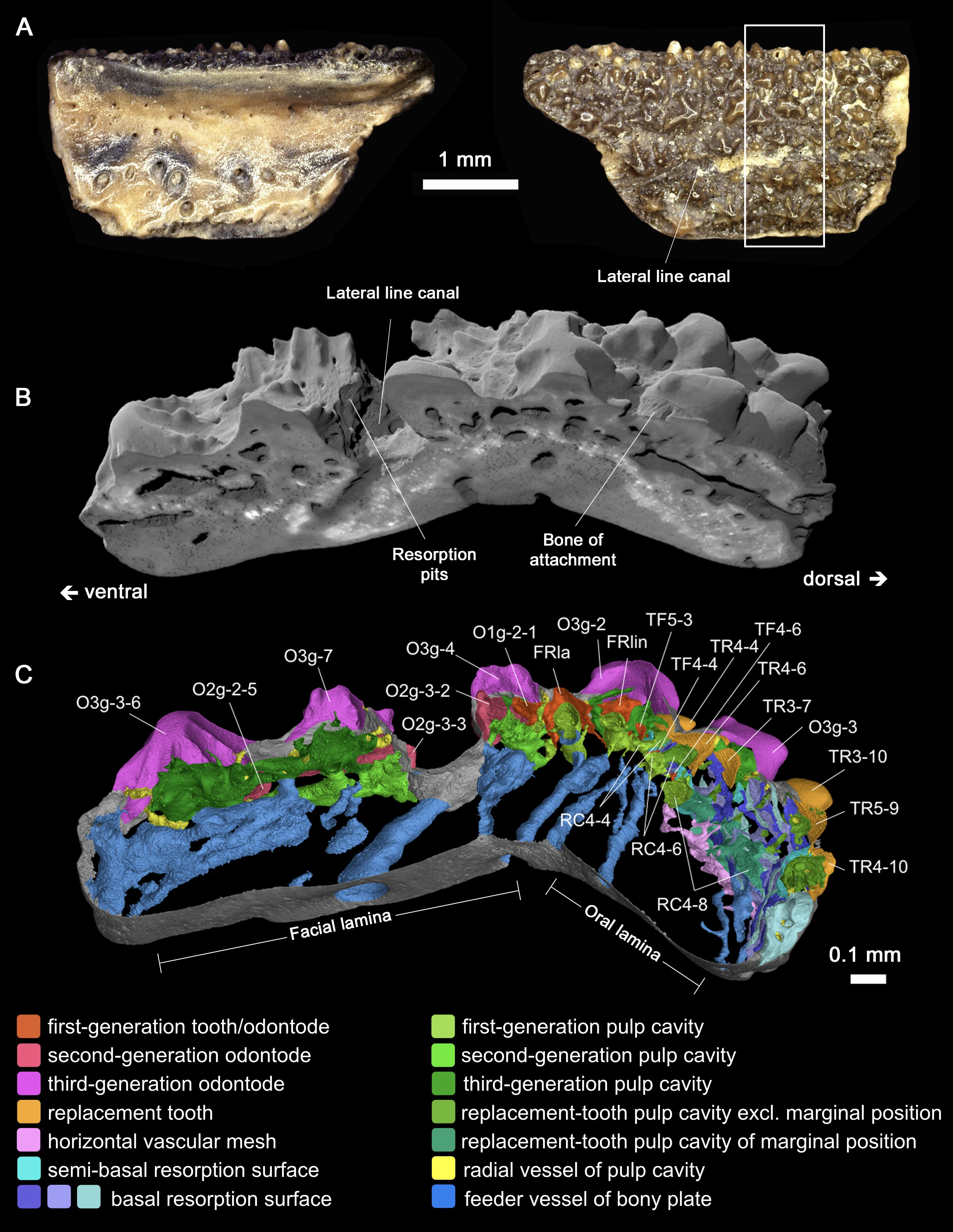
- Jaw bone

Scientific classification
- Kingdom: Animalia
- Phylum: Chordata
- Clade: Osteichthyes
- Genus: †Lophosteus; Pander, 1856
- Species: †L. superbus

Binomial name
- †Lophosteus superbus Pander, 1856

= Lophosteus =

Lophosteus Temporal range: Pridoli ~418.7–416 Ma

Extinct genus of bony fishes

Lophosteus is an extinct genus of prehistoric bony fish known from the Pridoli Ohesaare Formation of Estonia.
