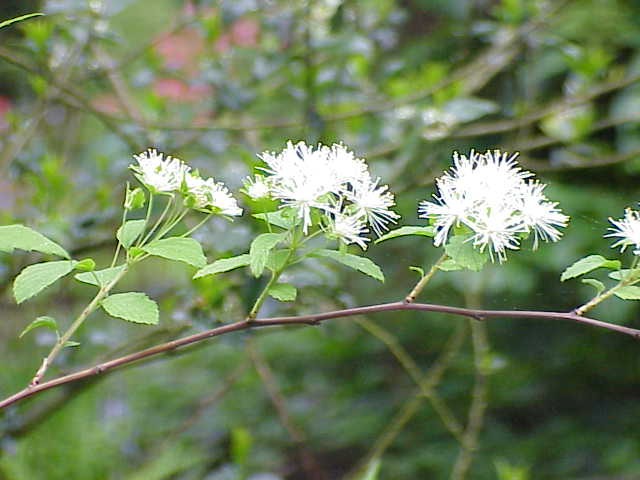
- Neviusia alabamensis flowers

Scientific classification
- Kingdom: Plantae
- Clade: Tracheophytes
- Clade: Angiosperms
- Clade: Eudicots
- Clade: Rosids
- Order: Rosales
- Family: Rosaceae
- Subfamily: Amygdaloideae
- Tribe: Kerrieae
- Genus: Neviusia; Gray

Genera
- Neviusia alabamensis; Neviusia cliftonii; †Neviusia dunthornei

= Neviusia =

Snow-wreath

Genus of flowering plants

Neviusia, the snow-wreaths, is a genus of ornamental plants, which are native to the United States, containing two extant species and one extinct species known from fossil leaves. This genus is a rare example of a disjunct range occurring in North America. The type species, Neviusia alabamensis, occurs in several southeastern states, while second extant species, Neviusia cliftonii, is endemic to the Shasta Lake region of California, and the extinct species Neviusia dunthornei is found in shale deposits in the Okanagan Highlands of Washington and British Columbia. It is named for Episcopal priest and botanist Reuben Nevius.
