= Garcorops jadis =

Scientific classification
- Kingdom: Animalia
- Phylum: Arthropoda
- Subphylum: Chelicerata
- Class: Arachnida
- Order: Araneae
- Infraorder: Araneomorphae
- Family: Selenopidae
- Genus: Garcorops
- Species: G. jadis

Binomial name
- Garcorops jadis Bosselaers, 2004

Synonyms
- Anyphops cortex

Possibly extinct species of spider known from copal

Garcorops jadis is a possibly extinct species of Wall crab spider, family Selenopidae, and at present, it is one of four known species in the genus Garcorops. The species is solely known from copal found on the beach near Sambava, on the northeast coast of Madagascar.

== History and classification ==
Garcorops jadis is known only from one fossil, the holotype. The single, adult male individual is preserved in a clear Hymenaea verrucosa copal specimen. The copal measures 70×20×12 millimetres (2.76×0.79×0.47 in) with several dipterans, a cockroach, a mite and a juvenile araneid spider also included within. The copal is currently housed in the Royal Museum for Central Africa in Tervuren, Belgium. G. jadis was first studied by Jan Bosselaers, with his March 2004 type description being published in the journal Zootaxa. The specific name was coined by Jan Bosselaers as a reference to Jadis, the White Witch from the 1950 children's fantasy novel The Lion, the Witch and the Wardrobe by C. S. Lewis in reference to the beautiful quality of preservation in the holotype specimen, which seems "enclosed in ice, frozen in time forever". In September 2004 paleoarachnologist Jörg Wunderlich published the description of ?Anyphops cortex, for which he was uncertain of the generic placement. After reviewing the type specimens of both ?Anyphops cortex and Garcorops jadis, David Penney, Hirotsugu Ono & Paul A. Selden determined the two specimens were from the same species belonging to Garcorops. As a result of the name Garcorops jadis being published first, ?Anyphops cortex was declared a junior synonym.

== Description ==
Garcorops jadis is 6.5 millimetres (0.26 in) with a carapace that is 3.0 by 2.8 millimetres (0.12 by 0.11 in). The carapace is a yellow-brown in color with some darker marking still visible and a coating of white hairs while the abdomen is also yellow-brown with some darker markings and pale pointed hairs. The legs are a similar in coloration to the body and show faint dark banded markings. The overall structure and positioning of the eyes indicates placement into the genus Garcorops. Of the extant species of Garcorops, G. jadis is most similar to the endemic G. madagascar. Both species have a well developed cymbial dorsal scopula with long embolus circling the bulbus. However the retrolateral tibial apophysis on the pedipalps of Garcorops jadis is more pointed than that of G. madagascar. Due to the preservation of the holotype and only known specimen in copal, it is uncertain as to the age and status of the species. It is possible that Garcorops jadis is an extant species which has not been recovered as live specimens. It is also possible, however, that the species is already extinct.
