= Meridiocichla =

Meridiocichla Temporal range: Late Pleistocene (possible Holocene record)

Scientific classification
- Kingdom: Animalia
- Phylum: Chordata
- Class: Aves
- Order: Passeriformes
- Family: Turdidae
- Genus: †Meridiocichla; Louchart, 2004
- Species: †M. salotti

Binomial name
- †Meridiocichla salotti Louchart, 2004

Extinct species of bird

Meridiocichla is an extinct genus of large thrush that inhabited Southern Europe during the Late Quaternary period. The sole species, M. salotti, is the largest known thrush from Europe, being about the size of a scaly thrush (Zoothera dauma). Its phylogenetic relations to other thrush species are unclear.

== Discovery and taxonomy ==
The only known fossils of Meridiocichla come from the islands of Corsica and Crete in the Mediterranean Sea. The fossils from Corsica constituted a premaxillary bone from Funtanedu Cave (dated to the Late Pleistocene or Holocene) and two humeri from Coscia Cave (Late Pleistocene), while the findings in Crete were from Liko Cave (Late Pleistocene). The Corsican fossils were labeled as "very large" and as having a bill larger than that of the mistle thrush (Turdus viscivorus). Its large size indicated that it was a thrush rather than an Old World flycatcher or starling, and direct comparisons of humeri proved an exact match to large thrushes of the genera Turdus and Zoothera, but also to the Old World flycatcher genus Myophonus, the whistling thrushes. The fossils were formally described and assigned to their own genus, Meridiocichla, mostly due to differences in beak morphology: the species had a large body size but with a short yet robust beak. The generic name Meridiocichla is a combination of the Latin word meridionalis, meaning "southern" (in reference to its Mediterranean distribution), and the Greek word kikhle, meaning "thrush". The specific epithet commemorates paleontologist and archeologist Michelle Salotti. The binomial name thus translates to "Salotti's southern thrush".

== Description ==
Meridiocichla would have been the largest thrush in its ecosystem, being similar in size to a scaly thrush. Like other thrushes, it was an omnivore. Despite the bird's large size and insular habitat, there were no signs of flightlessness in the fossils found. Its humerus-ulna length ratio was intermediate between that of more migratory thrushes and that of more sedentary ones, such as Horsfield's thrush (Zoothera dauma horsfieldi) or the Eurasian blackbird (Turdus merula).

== Distribution ==
The exact migration routes of Meridiocichla are unknown. It is unlikely that the species was limited to just Corsica and Crete, due to both the distance between the islands and due to there being several unconfirmed remains from continental France and Italy, as well as Mallorca. The remains of Meridiocichla show no sign of insular endemism. Instead, the Mediterranean islands may have simply served as part of the species' wintering grounds.

== Extinction ==
Meridiocichla appeared to have been already rare during the Late Pleistocene, and its disappearance coincided with the Late Pleistocene extinctions. Like the Pleistocene megafauna, its large size may have played a role in its extinction, due to larger species having lower population densities and lower local population sizes, especially on islands, where insular species can be particularly vulnerable to sudden threats.
