= Afropone =

Afropone Temporal range: Turonian

Scientific classification
- Domain: Eukaryota
- Kingdom: Animalia
- Phylum: Arthropoda
- Class: Insecta
- Order: Hymenoptera
- Family: Formicidae
- Subfamily: Ponerinae
- Tribe: incertae sedis
- Genus: †Afropone; Dlussky, Brothers & Rasnitsyn, 2004

Species
- Afropone oculata; Afropone (?) orapa

Extinct genus of ant

Afropone is an extinct genus of ant in the formicid subfamily Ponerinae, and is currently unplaced in any of the tribes of that subfamily. The genus contains two described species, Afropone oculata and Afropone (?) orapa. Afropone is known from a group of Upper Cretaceous fossils, which were found at Orapa in the Central District of Botswana.

== History and classification ==
Afropone oculata was described from two fossils, the holotype specimen number BP/2/28072a/2, identified as a female, and an additional poorly preserved fossil, number BP/2/26631-17. Afropone (?) orapa was based on a single holotype male, specimen BP/2/26628/1, and tentatively placed into the genus based on overall morphology. The specimens are mostly complete with variation in the quantity of detail, and are preserved as compression fossils in shale. The shales and mudstones of the Orapa site were rapidly deposited in a crater lake formed as the result of a large volcanic eruption in the Cretaceous. The sediment originated as an epiclastic kimberlite and derives from rapid weathering and decomposition of the sides of the kimberlite crater. Of the four major sedimentation types that have been observe at Orapa, fossils are found in only two, the granular mass flows and the fine-grained sediments: woody debris fossils are found in the granular mass flows, but well-preserved fossils are only recovered in the fine-grained sediments. The fossil-bearing stratum was uncovered during mining of the underlying diamond-bearing rocks at the site. Radiometric dating of the kimberlite pipe reported in 1977 gave an age in the general range of 84 to 92 million years ago. Further dating utilizing zircon crystals reported on in 2004 gave more defined age of approximately 91 million years ago placing the date in the Turonian age of the late Cretaceous.

The fossils were first studied by Russian paleontologists Gennady M. Dlussky and Alexandr Rasnitsyn with South African paleontologist Denis Brothers. Their 2004 type description of the new genus and species were published in the journal Insect Systematics and Evolution. The genus name Afropone is a combination of Africa, where the fossil was found, and Ponera, the type species of the subfamily Ponerinae. The specific epithet oculata, a derivation of the Latin word oculus meaning eye is a reference to the large eyes of the species. The specific epithet orapa is derived from the fossil locality name.

== Description ==
The eyes of Afropone species are large and well developed placed in the front portion of the head capsule in A. oculata females, and in the rear portion of the head capsule in A. (?) orapa males. Based on the preserved areas of known fossils, the mandibles of both species are short and rounded, without a distinct masticatory margin. Females of A. oculata are elongate being approximately 12 millimetres (0.47 in) long and have eyes which are 2.5 times as long as they are wide. The fore wings are narrow and 4.5 times longer than their width. As with other portions of the body both the mesosoma and petiole regions are narrowed. A. (?) orapa is smaller than A. oculata with a total body length of approximately 7 millimetres (0.28 in). Overall the antennae are filiform and are composed of flagellomeres that are twice as long as wide. The scape at the base of each is generally short.
