= Cheng-Ming Chuong =

Taiwanese-American biomedical scientist

- 鍾正明
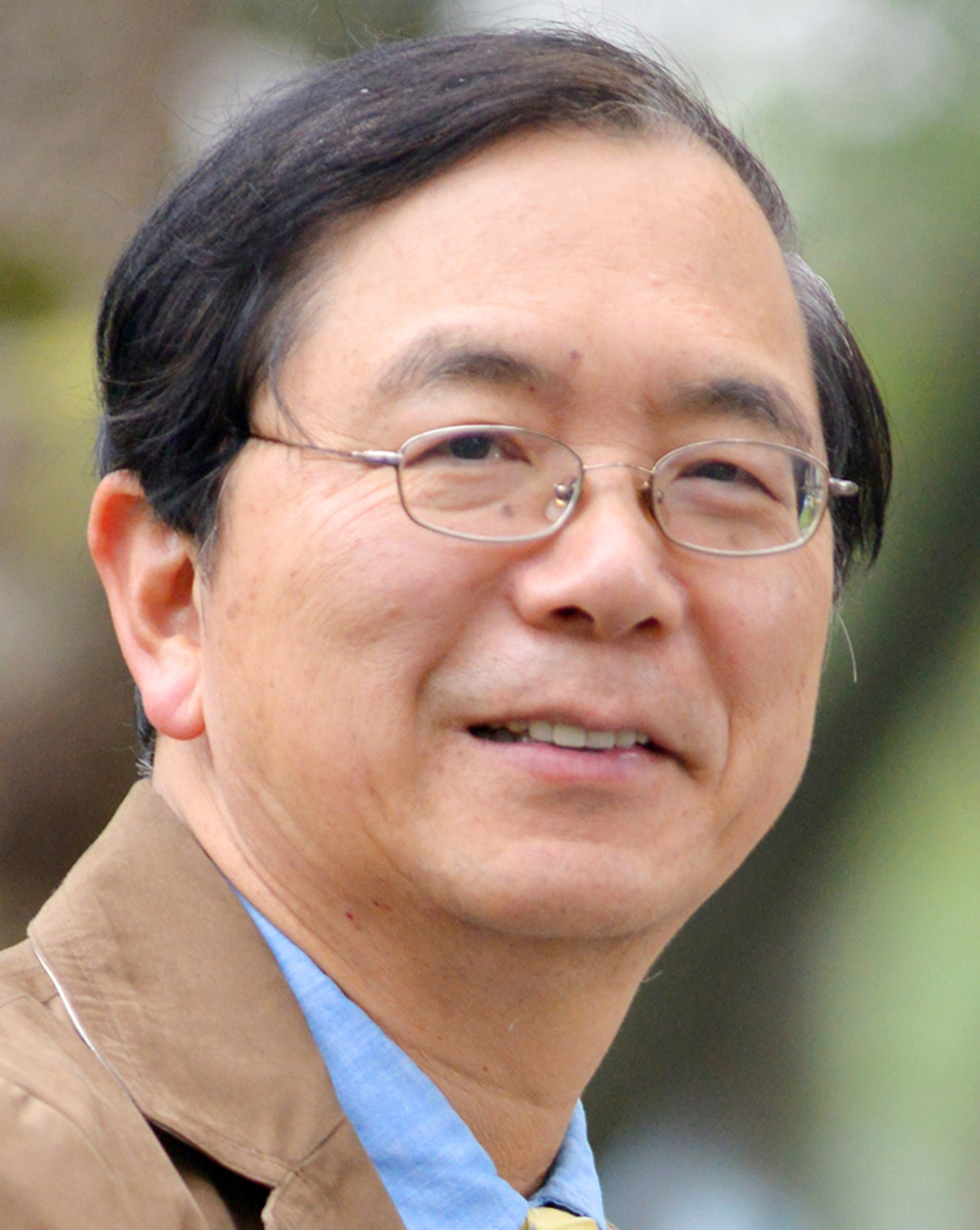
- Born: September 15, 1952 (age 74); Taipei, Taiwan
- Citizenship: American
- Education: National Taiwan University (MD); Rockefeller University (PhD)
- Scientific career
- Fields: Biomedical science
- Workplaces: University of Southern California

Cheng-Ming Chuong (Chinese: 鍾正明; born 1952) is a Taiwanese-American physician-scientist specializing in biomedical science. He is a professor of pathology at the University of Southern California and an academician of Academia Sinica in Taiwan.

== Early life and education ==
Chuong was born and raised in Taipei, Taiwan. He attended medical school at National Taiwan University, where he graduated with his Doctor of Medicine (M.D.) in 1978. He then earned his Ph.D. in developmental biology and molecular biology in 1983 from Rockefeller University. As a doctoral student, he studied neural cell adhesion molecules and pattern formation with Gerald M. Edelman and worked on identifying neural cell adhesion molecules and pattern formation in the brain.

== Career and research ==
He moved to the University of Southern California in 1987 and is currently a professor. Chuong directs the Laboratory of Tissue Development and Engineering in the Department of Pathology, USC. Using skin appendages as the experimental model, his team has studied how skin appendages undergo cyclic renewal and how these progenitor cells are guided to form specific tissue patterns and organ architectures in development, regeneration and evolution. The research of his laboratory has been supported by National Institute of Health since 1988.

He uses skin appendages as an experimental model and studies their organizing principles. He has particularly focused on feather morphogenesis. In 1998, he edited a book on "Epithelial Appendage Morphogenesis: Variations of a common theme and implications in regeneration". In 2003, he edited a special issue on the evolution and development of Integument with Dominique G. Homberger. In 2009, he edited another special issue with Michael K. Richardson on Pattern Formation. In 2016, he published an essay on "The Tao of integuments" in Science. He is mostly notable for:

Tissue patterning in the developing skin. In 1998, Chuong's laboratory showed how FGF/BMP fulfills Turing activator / inhibitor criteria in feather periodic pattern formation. In 1999, they demonstrated self-organizing process in skin explants using dissociated dermal cells. They further showed the assembly of dermal muscle network via mechanical force to build complex tissue patterning in the skin.

Building region-specific feathers. Chuong's laboratory set up a model to study feather follicle which allows them to identify feather stem cells and molecular circuits involved in forming radially symmetric, bilaterally symmetric, and bilaterally asymmetric feathers, as well as barb branch types (feather vane vs fluffy branches) from the proximal to distal feather. In 2019, they publish a comprehensive paper on the bio-architecture and adaptation of flight feathers. In addition to feather forms, they demonstrate melanocyte stem cells in feather follicles and how they form within-a-feather color patterns and how beta keratin gene clusters use a novel strategy for gene cluster regulation.

Reveal collective regenerative behavior in a hair follicle population. Chuong's team demonstrated intra-dermal adipose tissue exhibits BMP cycling which is out of phase with epidermal beta-catenin cycling in hair follicles. Further, the intra-dermal adipose BMP remains high during pregnancy and lactation to maintain hairs for nursing. These findings led to the concept that the extra-follicular macro-environment such as hormones, seasons, aging, can also modulate hair follicle stem cell activity. They developed Cellular Automata model to describe this temporal patterning process. Based on these, with topologically well-positioned hair plucking, they demonstrated an organ level quorum sensing process which can be hair regeneration more than those plucked. Furthermore, they showed that tissue rigidity is involved in wound induced follicle neogenesis and can be modulated to enhance Turing periodic patterning process for de novo hair regeneration. With these achievements, they are able to build reconstituted skin from dissociated progenitor cells for regenerative engineering.

Evo-Devo of integumentary organs. In addition to the micro-evolution, which is the modification of organ shape, size, such as those seen in feathers, beaks, or tooth, Chuong's team worked on the macro-evolution mechanisms by converting scales into feathers. They demonstrated the different regenerative mechanism of three different integumentary follicle types, hair, feather, and tooth. Chuong also works with paleontologists on Mesozoic feathers. The "Birth of Birds" was chosen as one of the 10 breakthroughs in 2014 by Science.

== Honors and awards ==
1988: American Cancer Society Junior Faculty Research Award

1991: Robert Cleland Teaching Award

1992: Zumberg Fellow, University of Southern California

1994: Robert Cleland Teaching Award, University of Southern California

2000: John Ebbling Lecture, European Hair Research Society

2002: Don Orwin Lecture, Australia

2004: Riken symposium, Japan

2006: Associates Award for Creativity in Research, Univ. Southern California

2006: Saxén Medal awardee, Sigrid Juselius International Symposium, Finland

2008: Elected to Academician, Academia Sinica, Taiwan (Taiwan National Academy)

2013: Keynote, Japan Developmental Biology Society

2014: Keynote, Korea Soc. Invest. Dermatology

2014: A review contributing to "Birth of birds" as one of the 10 breakthroughs by Science

2015: Elected to American Association for the Advancement of Science as a fellow

2016: Kligman/Frost Leadership Award, Soc. Investigative Dermatology

2018: Keynote, American Hair Research Summit

2018: Keynote, Taiwan Society for Developmental Biology

2020: NIH R37 MERIT award status, "Tissue patterning in living skin and explant cultures"

2021: Plenary talk, Am Association for Anatomy, annual meeting in Exp. Biology

Chuong has served as associated editors and in editorial boards in major developmental biology and dermatology journals. His grant on tissue patterning is awarded MERIT status in 2020.

He became honorary distinguished research professor of National Taiwan University, Taipei Medical University and several other major universities in Taiwan. He helps set up Integrative Evolutionary Galliform Genomics (iEGG) in National Chung Hsing University, International Wound Repair and Regenerative Center (iWRR) in National Cheng Kung University, and Integrative Stem Cell Center for China Medical University in Taiwan. He has helped organize stem cells, biomimetics, and avian model systems meeting in Taiwan.
