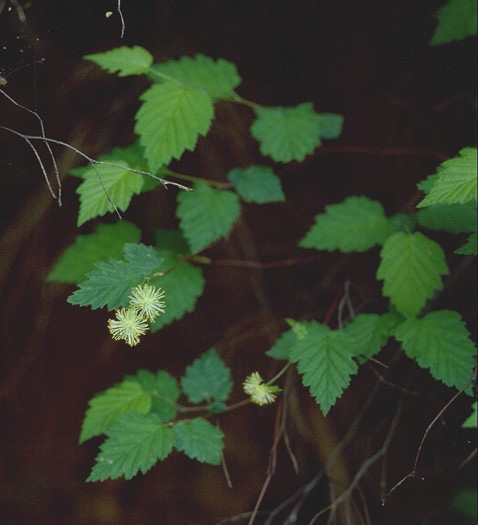

Conservation status
- Imperiled (NatureServe)

Scientific classification
- Kingdom: Plantae
- Clade: Tracheophytes
- Clade: Angiosperms
- Clade: Eudicots
- Clade: Rosids
- Order: Rosales
- Family: Rosaceae
- Genus: Neviusia
- Species: N. cliftonii

Binomial name
- Neviusia cliftonii Shevock, Ertter & D.W. Taylor

= Neviusia cliftonii =

Species of shrub

Neviusia cliftonii is a rare species of shrub in the rose family which is known by the common name Shasta snow-wreath. It is endemic to Shasta County, California, where it is known from about 25 occurrences in the mountains around Lake Shasta.

The shrub was not known to science until 1992, when it was discovered east of Redding, California and described as a new species in Neviusia, previously a monotypic genus.

== Description ==
Neviusia cliftonii is an erect deciduous shrub reaching 2.5 meters (8 ft) in maximum height. The alternately arranged leaves are oval or heart-shaped and lined with toothed lobes. The leaf blades reach 6.5 centimeters (2 1/2 in) long and are borne on short petioles. The inflorescence is an umbel-like cluster of 3 to 5 flowers. The flower is a ball of about 50 long, whiskery white stamens each about 0.5 cm (1/4 in) long. There is rarely a single white petal base to the stamens, although the petals are often absent. The fruit type is a soft-bodied achene a few millimeters long; anatomically the fruit is an achenetum.

=== Similar species ===
When not in flower, the plant resembles common shrubs such as oceanspray and ninebark, possibly why it went unrecognized for so long.
