= Protecovasaurus =

Protecovasaurus Temporal range: Late Triassic, 221.5–212 Ma

Scientific classification
- Kingdom: Animalia
- Phylum: Chordata
- Class: Reptilia
- Clade: Diapsida
- Clade: incertae sedis
- Genus: †Protecovasaurus; Heckert, 2004

Species
- P. lucasi Heckert, 2004 (type)

Extinct genus of reptiles

Protecovasaurus is a genus of archosaurian reptile from the Late Triassic Tecovas Formation of the southwestern United States. It was initially described as a basal ornithischian dinosaur, but was redescribed as a non-dinosaurian archosaur by Irmis et al. (2006). The type species, Protecovasaurus lucasi, was formally described by Andrew B. Heckert in 2004.

Its name, Protecovasaurus, means "before Tecovasaurus". Tecovas was the formation the holotype specimen was found in.
