= Selenops tonteldoos =

Scientific classification
- Kingdom: Animalia
- Phylum: Arthropoda
- Subphylum: Chelicerata
- Class: Arachnida
- Order: Araneae
- Infraorder: Araneomorphae
- Family: Selenopidae
- Genus: Selenops
- Species: S. tonteldoos

Binomial name
- Selenops tonteldoos Corronca, 2005

Species of spider

Selenops tonteldoos is a species of spider in the family Selenopidae. It is endemic to South Africa.

== Distribution ==
Selenops tonteldoos is found in Mpumalanga province in South Africa. The species is known only from the type locality at 1,999 m above sea level.

== Habitat and ecology ==
The species inhabits the Savanna biome and is a free-living cryptozoic nocturnal ground living spider.

== Description ==
Known only from the female. The carapace is reddish brown while the chelicerae are dark brown-reddish. The legs are dark brown with the dorsal portion of the femora being light brown. The terminal portion of all tibiae and metatarsi have whitish hairs. The abdomen is pale yellow with a central, longitudinal dark band that has lateral branches and lateral dark spots. The terminal portion of the opisthosoma has tufts of white hairs while the venter is yellowish. Total length is 14.30 mm.

== Conservation ==
Selenops tonteldoos is listed as Data Deficient by the IUCN due to taxonomic reasons. The species has a very small range and the status remains unclear. Additional sampling is needed to collect males and to determine the species' range.

== Etymology ==
The species is named after Tonteldoos, the location where it was first found.

== Taxonomy ==
The species was described by Corronca in 2005 from Dullstroom Tonteldoos.
