= Tonteldoos =

Village in Limpopo, South Africa

Coordinates: 25°19′S 29°59′E

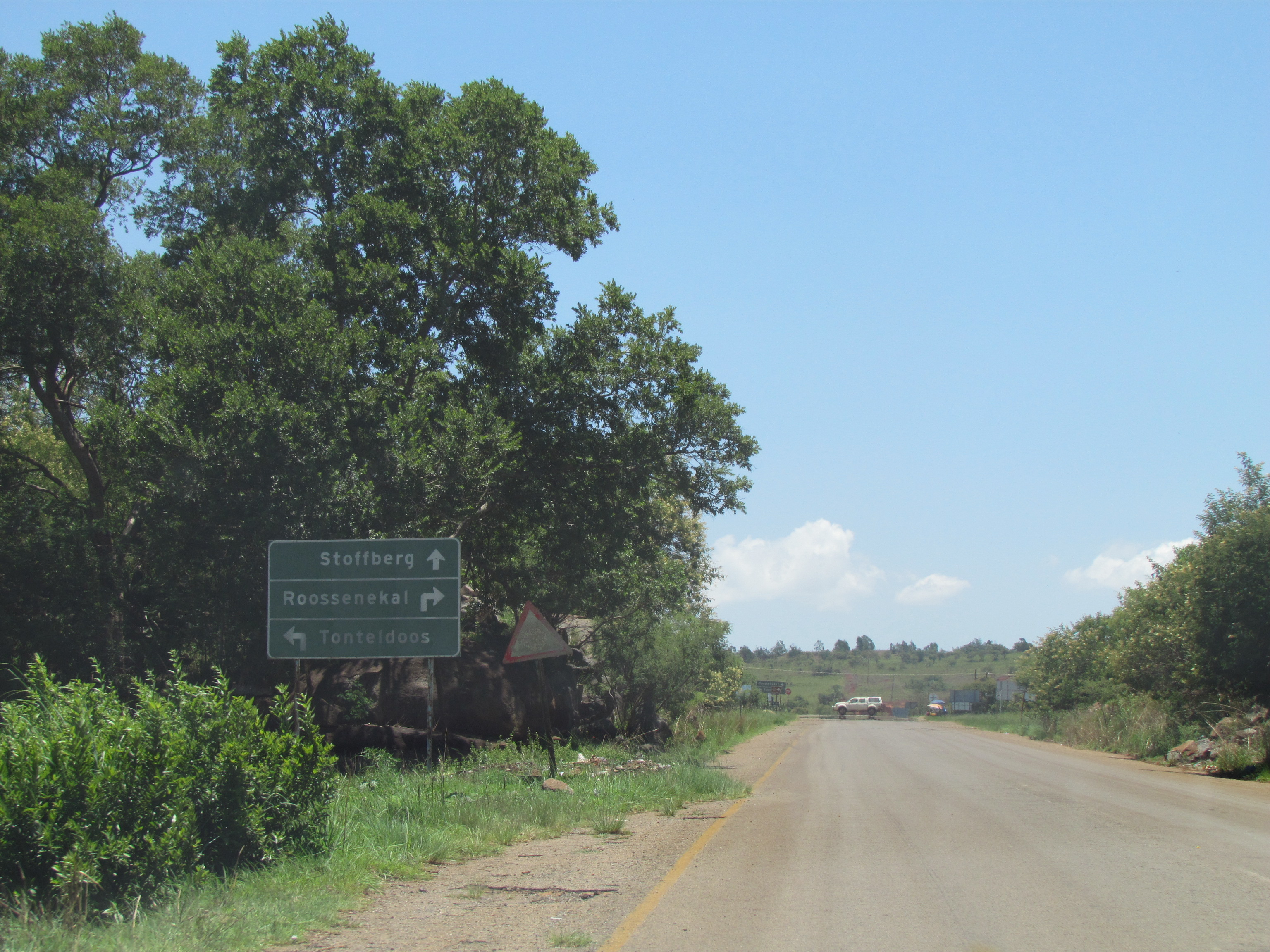

Tonteldoos is a village in the province of Limpopo, South Africa. It is located southeast of Roossenekal and 20 km northwest of Dullstroom, between the Steenkampsberg and Mapochsberg mountains. It is part of the Mapoch (Southern Ndebele people) land seized by poor settlers in 1883 after the Mapoch War against King Nyabêla. Each veteran of the war was granted 8 morgens of the land, while the rest is reserved for communal pasture.

The name most likely came from Samuel Smit naming his plot in October 1883, more likely after the local weed Haplocarpa scaposa (one of several plants popularly known as “tontelbossie”). The velvety back leaf, easily flammable when dry, was used to make tinderboxes at the time, and several species’ leaves are known as “tontel”. Flint can also be found in the area.

== Geography ==
White settlers began farming on the eastern side of the Tonteldoos Valley in the 1850s, including the Steenkamp brothers. Their three farms were Houtenbek, Klipbankspruit, and Draaikral. In 1879, Irishman Michael O’Grady purchased Houtenbek, where his descendants still farm. These farms are located above the Transvaal Supergroup, 2.5-billion-year-old rocks, while the western side of the valley is part of the Bushveld Igneous Complex, which is around 2 billion years old. The veld types differ: on the eastern slopes, there is nothing as it is too cold for trees save for a few stray, stunted shrubs, while the western side is largely grassy but also has twenty different species of trees.

== History of Houtenbek ==
In 1847, Houtenbek Farm was awarded to Willem Steenkamp. The local field cornet, C.M. du Plooy, visited on March 15, 1851, to survey the property. At the time, the standard method was to mark a central point, usually the homestead itself, and time horse rides to various points at the edge of the property. Willem called it “Houtenbek” (“wood at the mouth”) because there were several streams on the property, some of them tree-lined. During the First Mapoch War (1860-1865), all the family abandoned the farm.

Michael O’Grady was born in County Clare, Ireland in 1839, but emigrated to South Africa in the 1860s. He purchased Houtenbek in 1879 for £500. He bought it without seeing it, and was unaware that he was buying Mapoch land, which King Nyabêla reported to the magistrate in Lydenburg. Henrique Shepstone, the British Secretary of Native Affairs, visited with Nyabêla in July 1880 to resolve the situation, and with the failure of these negotiations, a Mapoch Commission was appointed. The First Boer War and the Mapoch War rendered the points moot, and O’Grady settled for the farm in July 1883, albeit elbow to elbow with poor whites both beyond and within Houtenbek’s western fringe. A few lawsuits secured his borders by 1891.

In 1887, O’Grady began a diary, still in the family’s possession, which primarily concentrated on his farming. A clay house was finished in 1894, and the first year recorded him moving 158 cattle, 1,400 sheep, three horses, and 513 goats from the sweetveld to the laeveld in the winter, as was the custom at the time. He also appointed a Mr. Berkshire to teach his children to read and write, and he hired several black servants. Some earned ten shillings or £1 a month, while others worked a year for a calf.

At the outbreak of the Second Boer War, O’Grady was too old to fight, but his son Thomas Frederick enlisted in the Boer Commandos. On April 20, 1901, the last entry in his diary read: “English troops at Korff’s farm Windhoek.” Soon after, they reached Houtenbek, burning down the entire farmhouse and imprisoning the entire family in the concentration camp near Balmoral. One of Michael’s granddaughters was buried there. On September 11, 1901, Roland Schikkerling wrote: “O’Grady’s farm is now a blackened desert. All that could be burned is lost, even the walls of the house. This place, once so busy and hospitable, is now a desolate wilderness. The fat cattle, the beautiful sheep, the proud horses that once teemed in herds are all gone. The gifted and cordial people were carried away—the fruit of their life’s work ruined. The rows of pear and apple trees’ white blossoms and the pink ones of the peach trees make a mockery of the scene.”

== Plants ==
=== Flowers ===
The Tonteldoos Valley is home to several rare and endangered species, such as the aloe Aloe reitzii var. reitzii. Another endangered species is Eucomis montana, also commonly called the pineapple flower. There are at least three species of arum lily, including the endangered Mapoch lily (Zantedeschia pentlandii).

Another threatened plant found here is Haemanthus humilis ssp. hirsitus. They usually hide in stone cracks. Brunsvigia radulosa, however, blossoms in the open veld. Experts have found more than twenty species of orchids in the valley, including Eulophia ovalis and Satyrium hallackii. Aloe pretoriensis, Aloe castanea, Aloe longibracteata, Aloe cooperii, and Aloe verdoorniae all bloom at certain times of the year.

=== Trees ===
Common Blankenveld (Highveld) trees found here include the shiny-leaf buckthorn (Rhamnus prinoides), mountain hard pear (Olinia emarginata), flame thorn (Senegalia ataxacantha), wild olive (Olea europaea subsp. cuspidata), kiepersol (Cussonia paniculata), and woolly bottlebrush (Greyia radlkoferi). At the highest points, just before the transition to the pure grassveld, there are also Protea roupelliae. Mixed bushveld trees predominate around the Mapoch Caves near Roossenekal.

== Plants endemic to Sekhukhuneland ==
Geology, weather, altitude, and fire contribute to the endemism of many plant species in South Africa. Sekhukhuneland, for instance, is home to more than fifty species endemic plant species, and includes the northern side of the Tonteldoos Valley. The grey cabbage tree, or Cussonia transvaalensis, is a case in point, as are the white karee’s cousins Rhus wimsii, Tetraselago nelsonii, and the aforementioned Mapoch lily.

== Common names ==
Canthium suberosum, another tonteldoos plant, goes by the name “kurkbokdrol” (Afrikaans for “cork goat dropping”) due to its resemblance to a wine cork. The spiny buds of the small knobwood (Zanthoxylum capense), akin to teats on udders, likewise earned it the common name “kleinperdekram” (“small horse breast”). False horsewood (Hippobromus pauciflorus) is named “basterperdepis” (“hybrid horse urine”) and Acalypha angustata var. glabra is termed “katpisbossie” (“cat urine bush”) based on the smell of their leaves. Dombeya rotundifolia, the dikbas or South African wild pear whose blossoms emerge at the start of spring, is labeled “drolpeer” (“excrement pear”).

== Agricultural history ==
There are several peach farms in the area. In the past, each farm would have several peach trees, usually clingstone peaches that ripened with the new year, prompting a rush to dry and sell them. In the fall, smoke from the poplar bushes signaled the fire times.

Schikkerling’s January 30, 1901, entry states that during the war, “many of [the] younger men attend catechism, while many of the elders distill brandy on the nearby fruit farms.”

By the 1930s, “Uncle” Joe and “Aunt” Hessie Kidson of Boomkraal were the most prominent citizens of Tonteldoos. Since the road through Tonteldoos from Boomkraal to Pospaal was often muddy in the rainy season, they easily kept watch for slow-moving customs officials through a system where small boys with mirrors would carry night traffic after the police had gone to bed. By the time the police reached Boomkraal, the kettle was hidden and Aunt Hessie could distill in peace.

In the 1950s, Rev. Dednam of Laersdrif set out to end the moonshine industry in the Mapoch area by buying out all the boilers at a high price and destroying them. The distillers gave him the money hoping to buy better boilers, but there were only two of high quality by 2000: Coen Swart of Ebenhaezer, Welgelukt, & Zwartdam, who made orange brandy; and Johann Dietlof Kunneke of Kristalwater, who distilled many fruits until the excise team caught him.
