= Lesedi =

Lesedi is a given name meaning "light." Notable people with the name include:

- Lesedi Sheya Jacobs (born 1997), Namibian tennis player
- Lesedi Kapinga (born 1995), South African soccer player

== Other ==
- Lesedi Cultural Village
- Lesedi FM
- Lesedi La Rona
- Lesedi Local Municipality
- Lesedi Solar Park
