= Selenops lesnei =

Mozambique Selenops Flat Spider

Conservation status
- Least Concern (SANBI Red List)

Scientific classification
- Kingdom: Animalia
- Phylum: Arthropoda
- Subphylum: Chelicerata
- Class: Arachnida
- Order: Araneae
- Infraorder: Araneomorphae
- Family: Selenopidae
- Genus: Selenops
- Species: S. lesnei

Binomial name
- Selenops lesnei Lessert, 1936

Synonyms
- Selenops rhodesianus Lawrence, 1940

Species of spider

Selenops lesnei is a species of spider in the family Selenopidae. It is found in Eritrea, Somalia, Rwanda, Burundi, Zimbabwe, Mozambique and South Africa and is commonly known as the Mozambique Selenops flat spider.

== Distribution ==
Selenops lesnei is found in Eritrea, Somalia, Rwanda, Burundi, Zimbabwe, Mozambique and South Africa. In South Africa, it occurs in Limpopo and Mpumalanga provinces at altitudes ranging from 894 to 1,328 m above sea level.

== Habitat and ecology ==
The species inhabits the Savanna biome and is a free-living cryptozoic nocturnal ground living spider.

== Description ==
Known from both sexes. Selenops lesnei resembles S. vigilans, but the females can be distinguished by the shape of the epigyne where the middle field is wider and shorter than in S. vigilans and by the shape of the spermathecae. The males are characterized by the shape of the tibial apophysis and the falciform conductor.

== Conservation ==
Selenops lesnei is listed as Least Concern by the South African National Biodiversity Institute due to its wide geographical range in Africa. The species is protected in Blouberg Nature Reserve.

== Etymology ==
The species name honors P. Lesne, one of the collectors of the type material.

== Taxonomy ==
The species was originally described by Lessert in 1936 from Mozambique. It was revised by Corronca in 2002. Selenops rhodesianus Lawrence, 1940 was synonymized with this species by Corronca in 1998.
