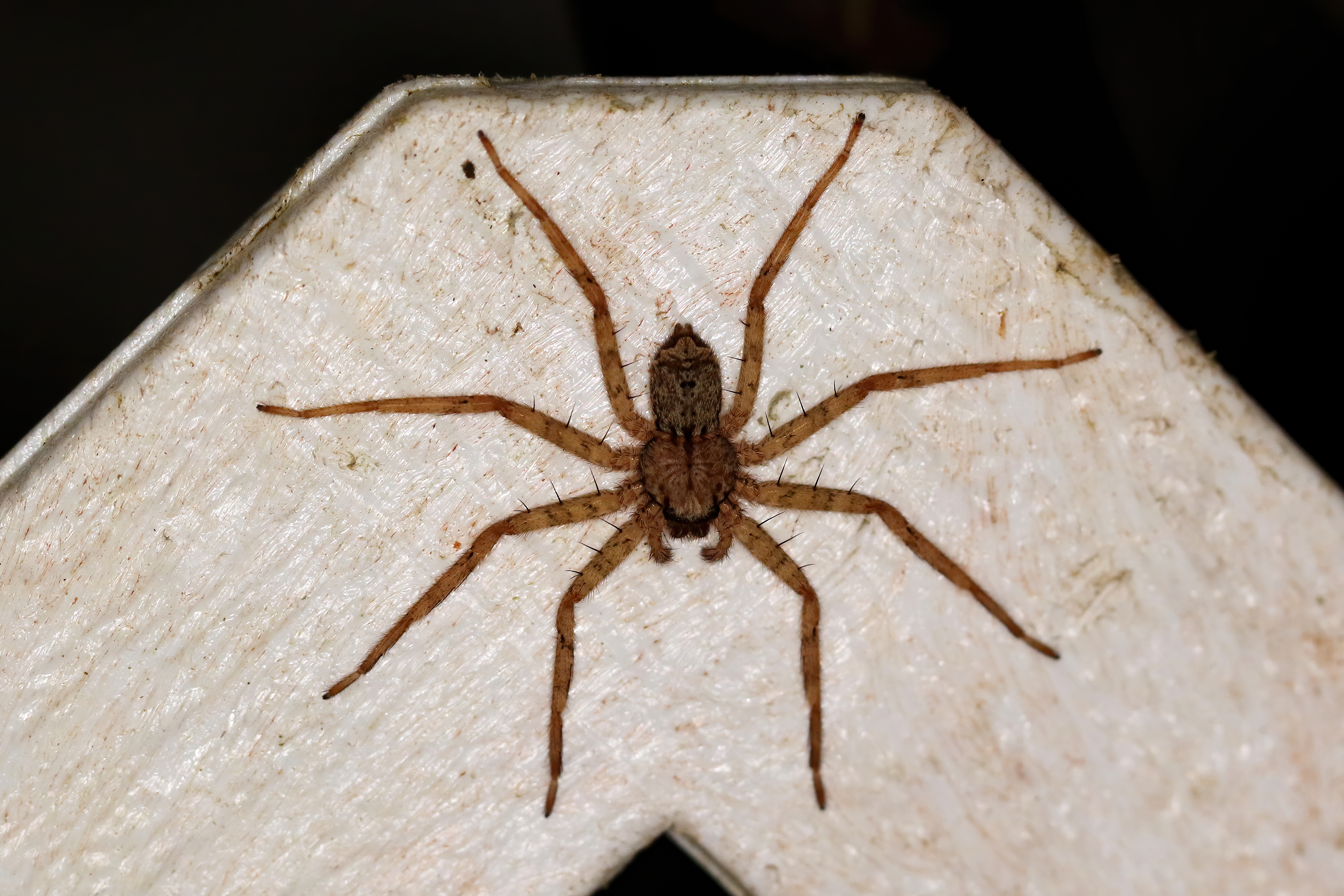

Scientific classification
- Domain: Eukaryota
- Kingdom: Animalia
- Phylum: Arthropoda
- Subphylum: Chelicerata
- Class: Arachnida
- Order: Araneae
- Infraorder: Araneomorphae
- Family: Selenopidae
- Genus: Selenops
- Species: S. insularis

Binomial name
- Selenops insularis Keyserling, 1881

= Selenops insularis =

Species of spider

Selenops insularis is a species of flatty in the spider family Selenopidae. It is found in the United States and Greater Antilles.

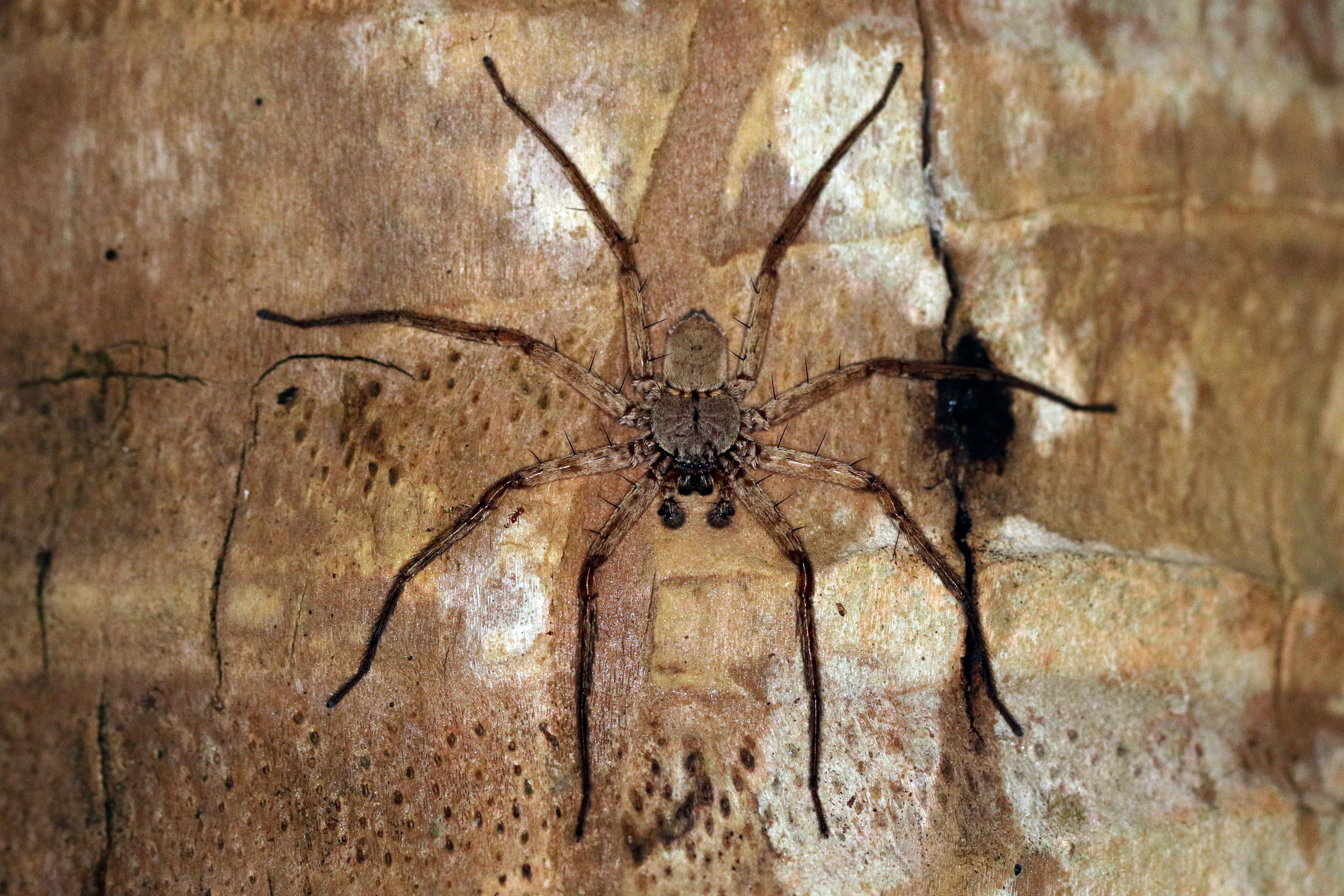
