= Southern Ndebele =

Southern Ndebele may refer to:

- Southern Ndebele people
- Southern Ndebele language
