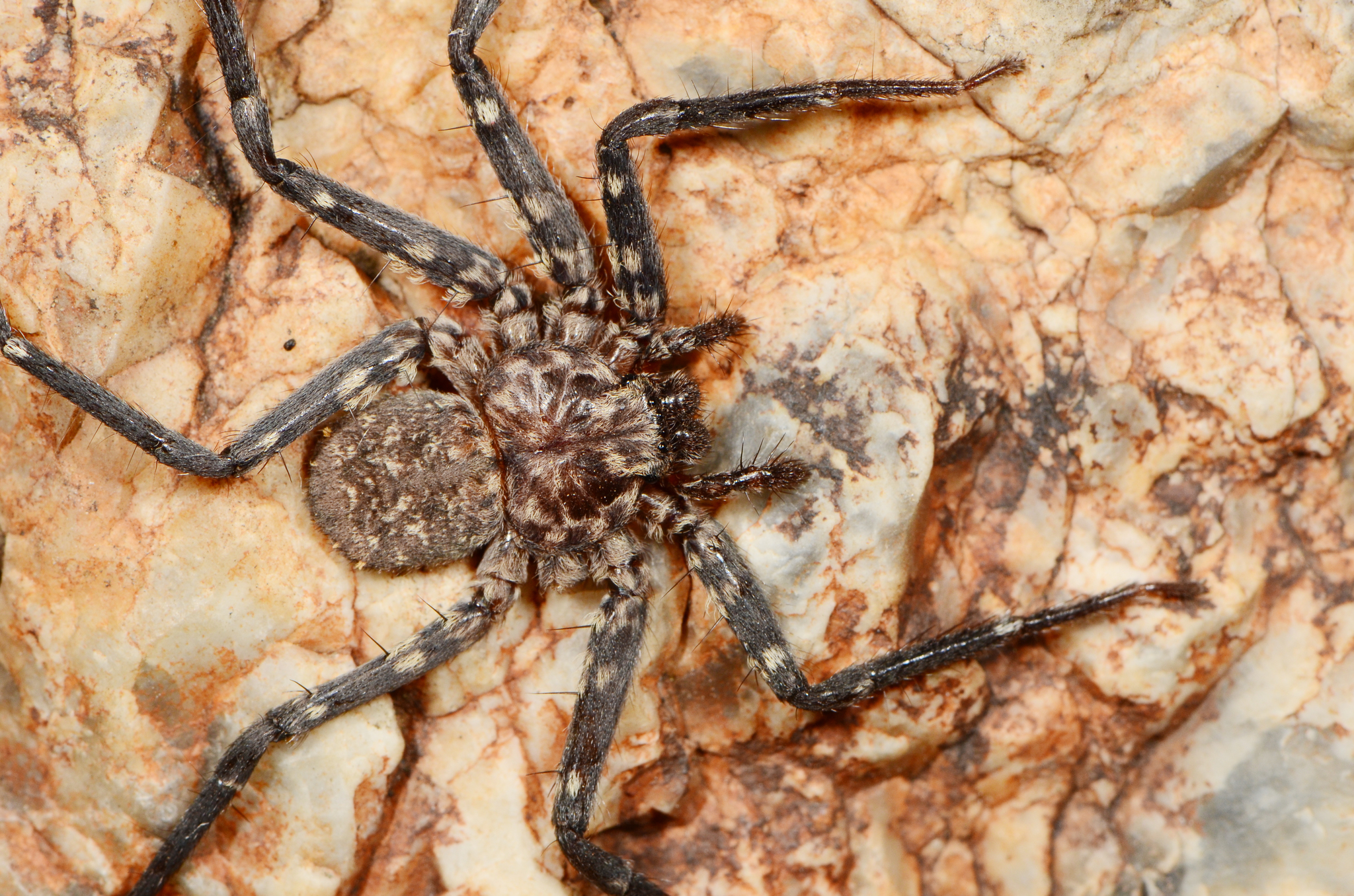
- Female

Scientific classification
- Kingdom: Animalia
- Phylum: Arthropoda
- Subphylum: Chelicerata
- Class: Arachnida
- Order: Araneae
- Infraorder: Araneomorphae
- Family: Selenopidae
- Genus: Selenops
- Species: S. ansieae

Binomial name
- Selenops ansieae Corronca, 2002

= Selenops ansieae =

Waterberg Selenops Flat Spider

Species of spider

Selenops ansieae is a species of spider in the family Selenopidae. It is endemic to South Africa and is commonly known as the Waterberg Selenops flat spider.

== Distribution ==
Selenops ansieae is found in Limpopo province in South Africa. The species has been recorded from Waterberg, Vygeboompoort and Lephalale/Ellisras at altitudes ranging from 840 to 1,467 m above sea level.

== Habitat and ecology ==
The species inhabits the Savanna biome and is a free-living cryptozoic nocturnal ground living spider.

== Conservation ==
Selenops ansieae is listed as Data Deficient by the IUCN due to taxonomic reasons. The status of the species remains unclear and additional sampling is needed to collect males and to determine the species' range.

== Etymology ==
The species is named after South African arachnologist Ansie Dippenaar-Schoeman.

== Taxonomy ==
The species was described by Corronca in 2002 from the Waterberg, Vygeboompoort. It is known only from the female. The carapace is orange-brown, chelicerae are orange, and legs are orange-brown with dark incomplete rings on femora I-IV and tibiae I-IV. The venter is yellowish. Total length is 8.78 mm.
