= Selenops lobatse =

Scientific classification
- Kingdom: Animalia
- Phylum: Arthropoda
- Subphylum: Chelicerata
- Class: Arachnida
- Order: Araneae
- Infraorder: Araneomorphae
- Family: Selenopidae
- Genus: Selenops
- Species: S. lobatse

Binomial name
- Selenops lobatse Corronca, 2001

Species of spider

Selenops lobatse is a species of araneomorphae spider in the family Selenopidae.

== Distribution ==
The species is endemic to North West, South Africa · .

== Description ==
The female holotype measures 9.70 mm.

== Etymology ==
The name of the species was given in reference to the place of its discovery, Lobatse.

== Publications ==
- Corronca, 2001 : Three new species of Selenops Latreille, 1819 (Aranei: Selenopidae) from Afrotropical region. Arthropoda Selecta, vol. 10, No. 1, p. 55-58.
