= Selenops feron =

Baviaanspoort Selenops Flat Spider

Conservation status
- Least Concern (SANBI Red List)

Scientific classification
- Kingdom: Animalia
- Phylum: Arthropoda
- Subphylum: Chelicerata
- Class: Arachnida
- Order: Araneae
- Infraorder: Araneomorphae
- Family: Selenopidae
- Genus: Selenops
- Species: S. feron

Binomial name
- Selenops feron Corronca, 2002

Species of spider

Selenops feron is a species of spider in the family Selenopidae. It is found in Namibia, Zimbabwe and South Africa and is commonly known as the Baviaanspoort Selenops Flat Spider.

== Distribution ==
Selenops feron is found in Namibia, Zimbabwe and South Africa. In South Africa, it is known only from the type locality in Gauteng at 1,297 m above sea level.

== Habitat and ecology ==
The species is a free-living cryptozoic nocturnal ground living spider. It has been sampled from under rocks in the Grassland biome.

== Description ==
Known only from female. Carapace brown with broad pale central marking and faint striae radiating forwards and sideways from fovea. Abdomen above with dark median area and dark mottled brown on sides, a few white speckles among the predominating brown ones. Legs brown with some vague bands. Total length 9-10 mm.

== Conservation ==
Selenops feron is listed as Least Concern by the South African National Biodiversity Institute due to its wide geographical range across three southern African countries.

== Taxonomy ==
The species was described by Corronca in 2002 from Baviaanspoort in Gauteng.
