= Selenops tenebrosus =

Gravelotte Selenops Flat Spider

Conservation status
- Least Concern (SANBI Red List)

Scientific classification
- Kingdom: Animalia
- Phylum: Arthropoda
- Subphylum: Chelicerata
- Class: Arachnida
- Order: Araneae
- Infraorder: Araneomorphae
- Family: Selenopidae
- Genus: Selenops
- Species: S. tenebrosus

Binomial name
- Selenops tenebrosus Lawrence, 1940

Species of spider

Selenops tenebrosus is a species of spider in the family Selenopidae. It is found in Zimbabwe and South Africa and is commonly known as the Gravelotte Selenops flat spider.

== Distribution ==
Selenops tenebrosus is found in Zimbabwe and South Africa. In South Africa, it occurs in Limpopo province at altitudes ranging from 418 to 1,341 m above sea level.

== Habitat and ecology ==
The species inhabits the Savanna biome and is a free-living cryptozoic nocturnal ground living spider.

== Description ==
Known only from the female. Carapace rich dark reddish brown with a conspicuous pattern of markings in addition to the fovea, foveal radiations, and the boundaries of the cephalic area. Mandibles reddish black. Abdomen almost entirely black above with 1 or 2 pairs of light spots in its anterior half, ventral surface yellow brown, the sides and posterior margin black, spinners almost encircled with black. Legs uniformly black, a little lighter towards their bases. Tibiae I and II with 3 pairs of inferior spines, metatarsi I and II with 2 stout pairs of inferior spines. Total length 23 mm.

== Conservation ==
Selenops tenebrosus is listed as Least Concern by the South African National Biodiversity Institute due to its wide geographical range in southern Africa. The species is protected in Kruger National Park and Lhuvhondo Nature Reserve.

== Taxonomy ==
The species was originally described by Lawrence in 1940 from Gravelotte in Limpopo. It was revised by Corronca in 2002.
