= Selenops intricatus =

Conservation status
- Least Concern (SANBI Red List)

Scientific classification
- Kingdom: Animalia
- Phylum: Arthropoda
- Subphylum: Chelicerata
- Class: Arachnida
- Order: Araneae
- Infraorder: Araneomorphae
- Family: Selenopidae
- Genus: Selenops
- Species: S. intricatus

Binomial name
- Selenops intricatus Simon, 1910

Synonyms
- Selenops cavernicolus Lawrence, 1952

Species of spider

Selenops intricatus is a species of spider in the family Selenopidae. It is found in Senegal, Guinea-Bissau, the Democratic Republic of the Congo and South Africa.

== Distribution ==
Selenops intricatus is found in Senegal, Guinea-Bissau, Democratic Republic of the Congo and South Africa. In South Africa, it is known from KwaZulu-Natal at 221 m above sea level.

== Habitat and ecology ==
The species inhabits the Savanna biome and is a free-living cryptozoic nocturnal ground living spider. In the Democratic Republic of the Congo it was collected from caves.

== Description ==
Known from both sexes. The females can be distinguished by the shape of the elongated or rhomboidal middle field that is always longer than wide. In the males the shape of the tibial apophysis of the palp is similar to that of S. radiatus and S. annulatus, but in S. intricatus the branches are subequal in length and the tip of the conductor is wider than in S. annulatus. Total length 12 mm.

== Conservation ==
Selenops intricatus is listed as Least Concern by the South African National Biodiversity Institute due to its wide geographical range in Africa. The species is protected in Hluhluwe Nature Reserve.

== Taxonomy ==
The species was originally described by Simon in 1910 from Guinea-Bissau. It was revised by Corronca in 2002. Selenops cavernicolus Lawrence, 1952 was synonymized with this species by Benoit in 1968.
