= Selenops brachycephalus =

Zimbabwe Selenops Flat Spider

Conservation status
- Least Concern (SANBI Red List)

Scientific classification
- Kingdom: Animalia
- Phylum: Arthropoda
- Subphylum: Chelicerata
- Class: Arachnida
- Order: Araneae
- Infraorder: Araneomorphae
- Family: Selenopidae
- Genus: Selenops
- Species: S. brachycephalus

Binomial name
- Selenops brachycephalus Lawrence, 1940

Species of spider

Selenops brachycephalus is a species of spider in the family Selenopidae. It is found in Zimbabwe and South Africa and is commonly known as the Zimbabwe Selenops Flat Spider.

== Distribution ==
Selenops brachycephalus is found in Zimbabwe and South Africa. In South Africa, it occurs in Limpopo and Mpumalanga provinces at altitudes ranging from 211 to 1,372 m above sea level.

== Habitat and ecology ==
The species inhabits the Savanna biome and is a free-living cryptozoic nocturnal ground living spider.

== Description ==
Known only from the female. Carapace brown with some darker markings radiating forwards and sideways from thoracic stria, those in cephalic portion more strongly defined. Abdomen above dark mottled brown, a few white speckles among the predominating brown ones. Legs brown with some vague bands. Total length 10-12 mm.

== Conservation ==
Selenops brachycephalus is listed as Least Concern by the South African National Biodiversity Institute due to its wide geographical range. The species is protected in Blouberg Nature Reserve, Lhuvhondo Nature Reserve and Kruger National Park.

== Taxonomy ==
The species was originally described by Lawrence in 1940 from Zimbabwe. It was revised by Corronca in 2002. Additional sampling is needed to collect males and to determine the species' complete range.
