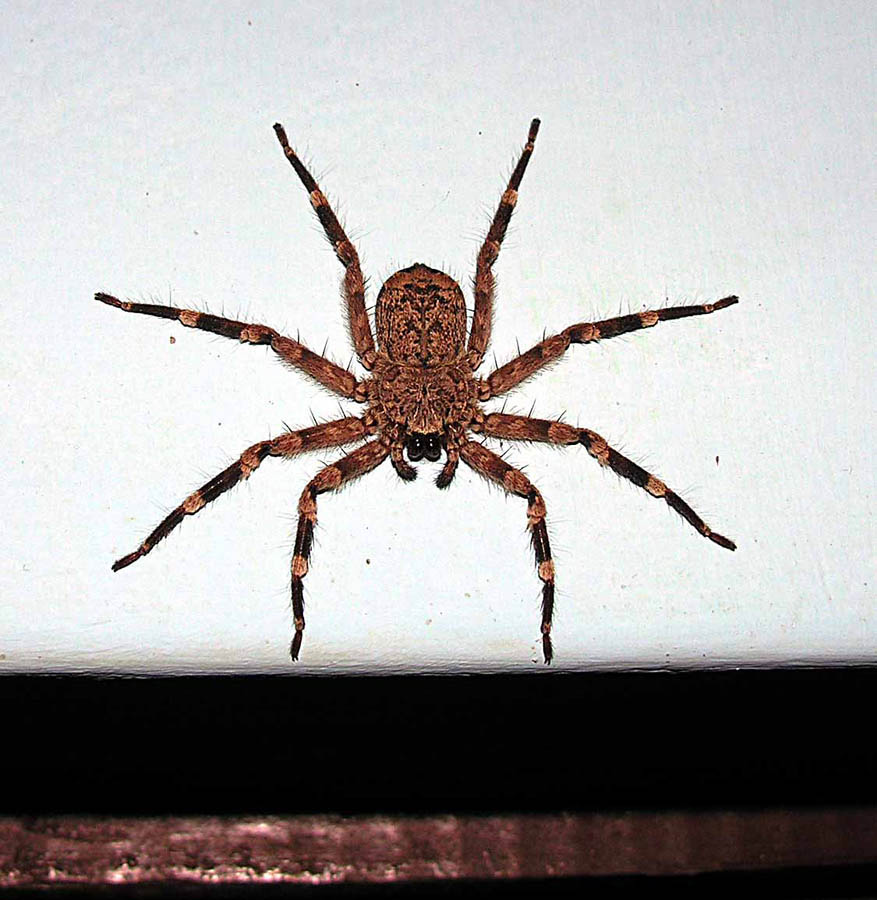
- A room mate in Mbinga, Tanzania
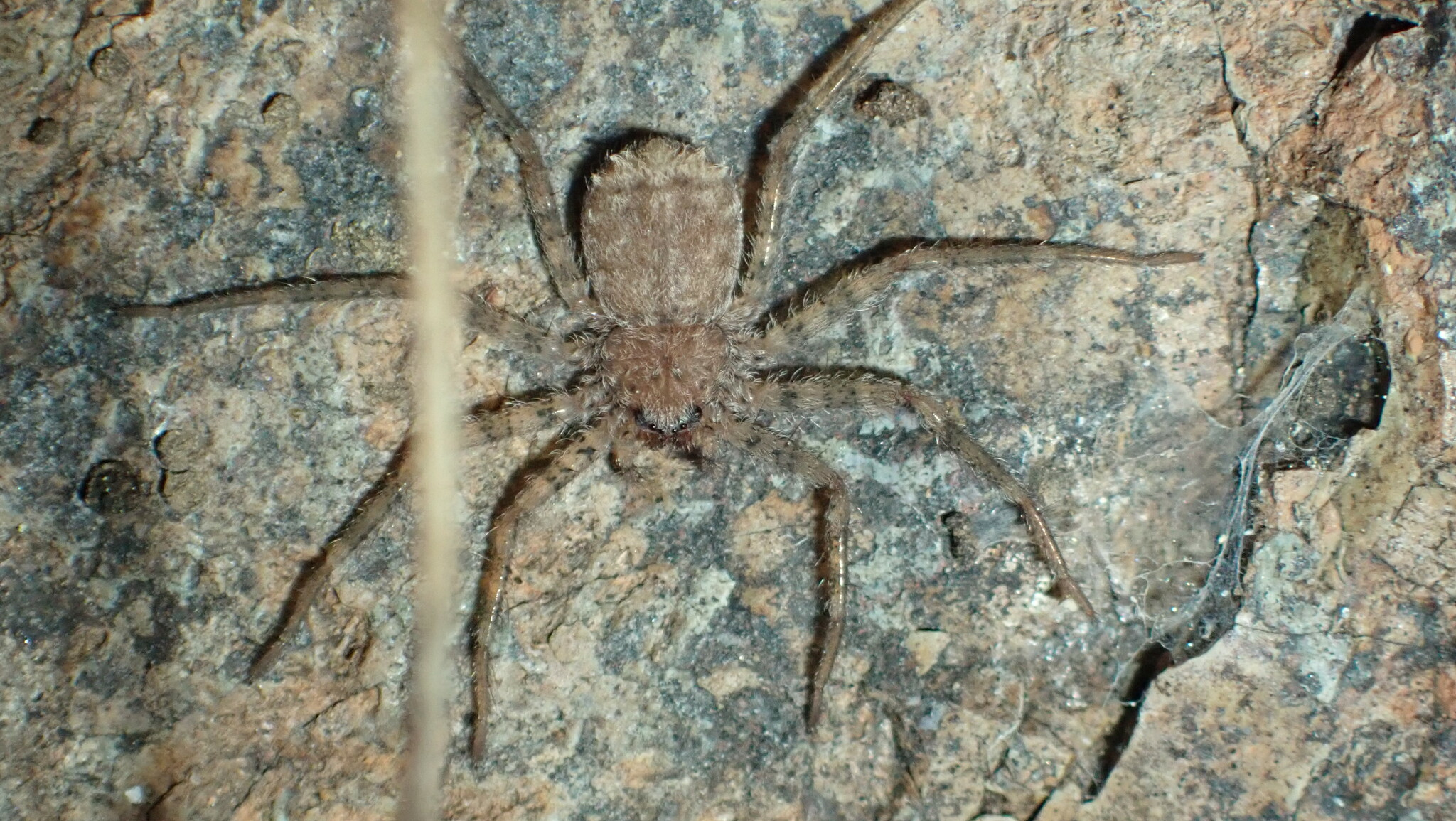
- S. radiatus the wild

Scientific classification
- Kingdom: Animalia
- Phylum: Arthropoda
- Subphylum: Chelicerata
- Class: Arachnida
- Order: Araneae
- Infraorder: Araneomorphae
- Family: Selenopidae
- Genus: Selenops
- Species: S. radiatus

Binomial name
- Selenops radiatus Latreille, 1819

Synonyms
- Selenops omalosoma Dufour, 1820; Selenops aegyptiaca Audouin, 1826; Selenops annulipes Walckenaer, 1837; Selenops peregrinator Walckenaer, 1837; Selenops alacer Blackwall, 1865; Selenops sansibaricus Gerstaecker, 1873; Selenops radiata Simon, 1875; Selenops latreillei Simon, 1875; Selenops malabarensis Simon, 1880; Selenops birmanicus Thorell, 1895; Selenops diversus O. Pickard-Cambridge, 1898; Selenops strandi Caporiacco, 1941; Selenops montanus Caporiacco, 1947; Selenops röweri Caporiacco, 1949; Selenops sumitrae Patel & Patel, 1973; Selenops cordatus Zhu, Sha & Chen, 1990

= Selenops radiatus =

Common Selenops Flat Spider

Species of spider

Selenops radiatus is a species of spider in the family Selenopidae. It has a cosmopolitan distribution found in the Mediterranean, Africa, Middle East, India, Myanmar and China and is commonly known as the Common Selenops flat spider.

== Distribution ==
Selenops radiatus is a cosmopolitan species with a very wide global distribution.

== Habitat and ecology ==
The species is a free-living cryptozoic nocturnal spider that is commonly found in houses and outbuildings as well as in a wide range of other habitats. It inhabits Grassland, Savanna and Thicket biomes. The species may play a role in regulating populations of potato tuber moths, cockroaches and silver-fish.

== Description ==
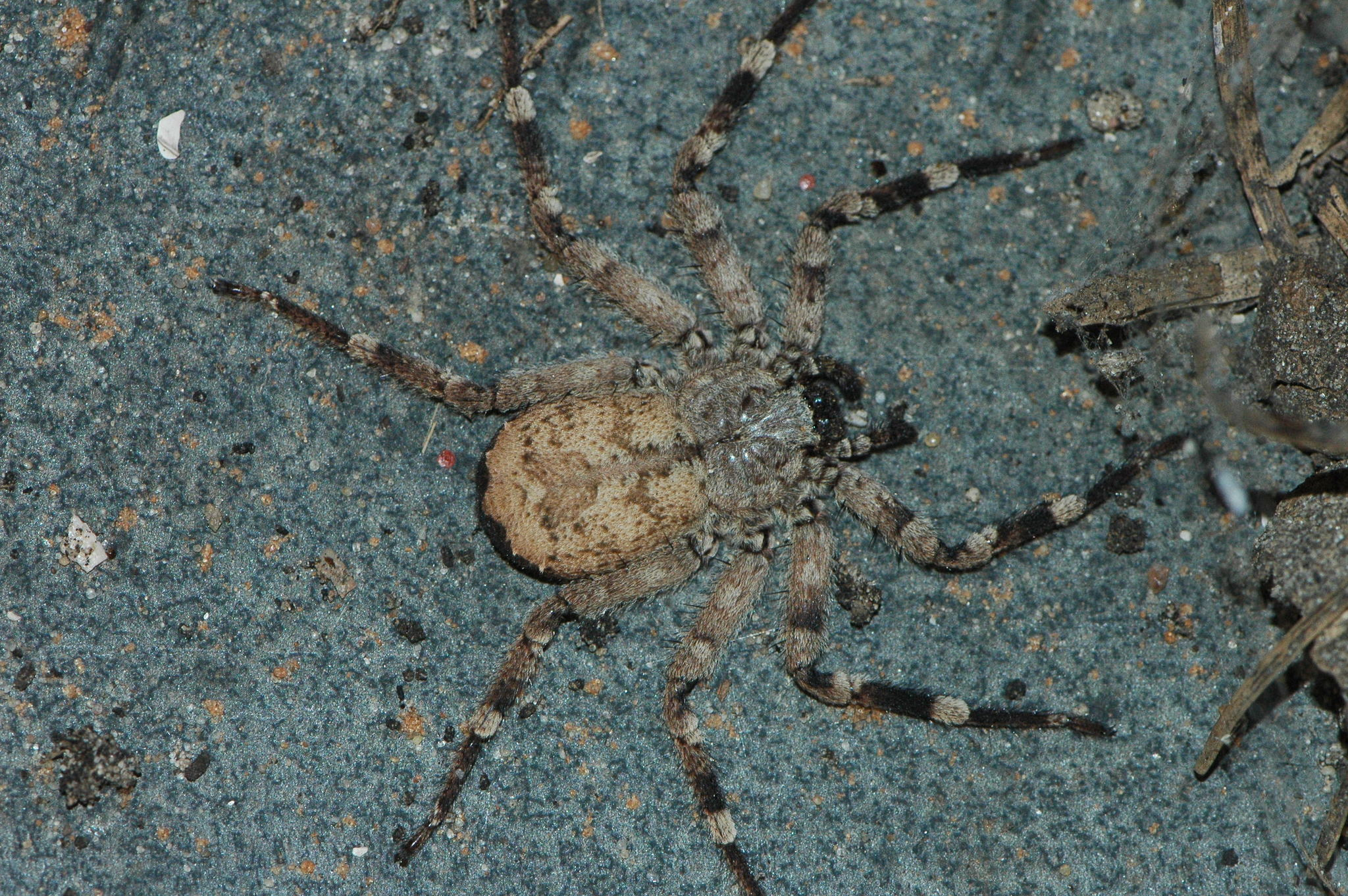

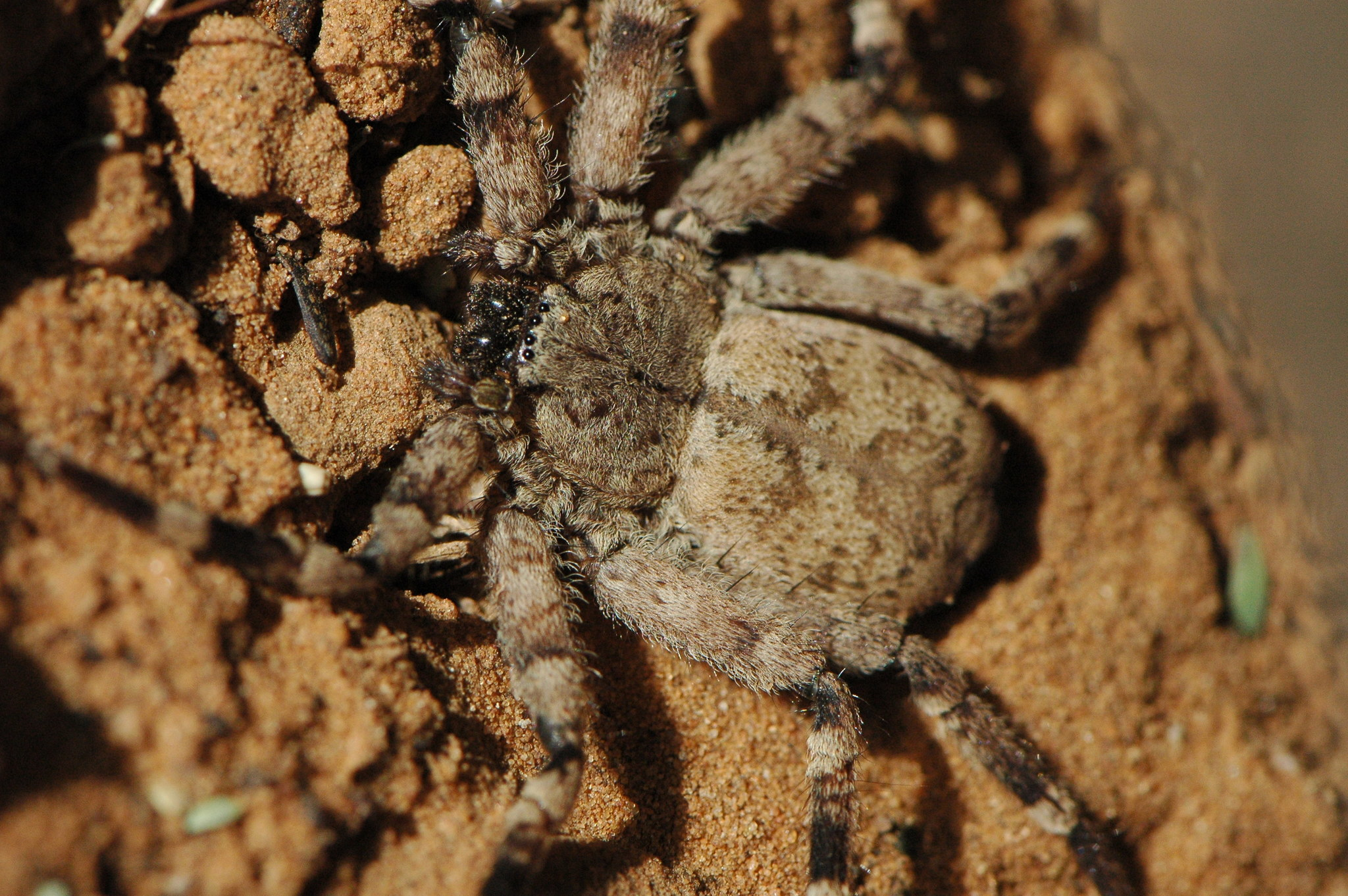

A species known from both sexes. Carapace brown with dark striae radiating forwards and sideways from fovea. abdomen above with dark median area and dark mottled brown on sides, a few white speckles among the predominating brown ones. Legs grey with femora paler and all legs with distinct white bands.

== Conservation ==
Selenops radiatus is listed as Least Concern by the South African National Biodiversity Institute due to its wide global geographical range. In South Africa, the species is protected in five reserves: Platberg Nature Reserve, Roodeplaatdam Nature Reserve, Tswaing Crater Nature Reserve, Sabie Sabie Reserve and Kruger National Park.

== Taxonomy ==
S. radiatus was originally described by Latreille in 1819. It has numerous synonyms reflecting its wide distribution and historical taxonomic confusion. The species has been extensively revised by multiple authors over time.

== Subspecies ==
These two subspecies belong to the species Selenops radiatus:

- Selenops radiatus fuscus Franganillo, 1926
- Selenops radiatus radiatus Latreille, 1819
