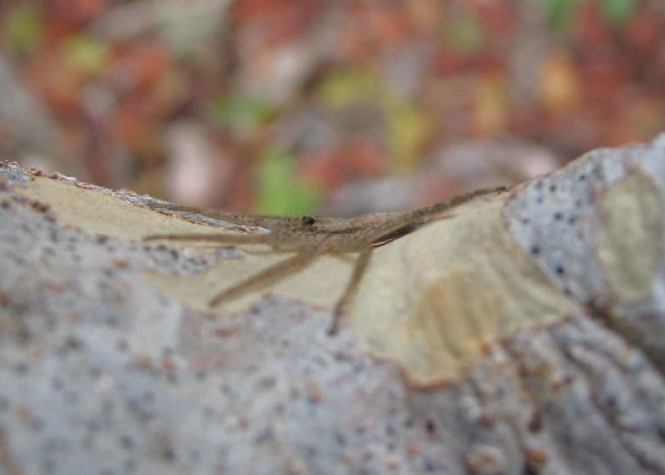

Scientific classification
- Domain: Eukaryota
- Kingdom: Animalia
- Phylum: Arthropoda
- Subphylum: Chelicerata
- Class: Arachnida
- Order: Araneae
- Infraorder: Araneomorphae
- Family: Selenopidae
- Genus: Selenops
- Species: S. submaculosus

Binomial name
- Selenops submaculosus Bryant, 1940

= Selenops submaculosus =

Species of spider

Selenops submaculosus is a species of flatty in the family of spiders known as Selenopidae. It is found in the United States, Bahama Islands, Cuba, and Cayman Islands.
