= Selenops zuluanus =

Ingwavuma Selenops Flat Spider

Conservation status
- Least Concern (SANBI Red List)

Scientific classification
- Kingdom: Animalia
- Phylum: Arthropoda
- Subphylum: Chelicerata
- Class: Arachnida
- Order: Araneae
- Infraorder: Araneomorphae
- Family: Selenopidae
- Genus: Selenops
- Species: S. zuluanus

Binomial name
- Selenops zuluanus Lawrence, 1940

Species of spider

Selenops zuluanus is a species of spider in the family Selenopidae. It is found in Botswana, Zimbabwe and South Africa and is commonly known as the Ingwavuma Selenops flat spider.

== Distribution ==
Selenops zuluanus is found in Botswana, Zimbabwe and South Africa. In South Africa, it occurs in KwaZulu-Natal, Limpopo and Mpumalanga provinces at altitudes ranging from 47 to 1,411 m above sea level.

== Habitat and ecology ==
The species inhabits the Savanna biome and is a free-living cryptozoic nocturnal ground living spider.

== Description ==
Known from both sexes. The carapace is reddish brown and darker anteriorly, with a dark marginal border and some ill-defined thoracic striae. There is an indistinct dark stripe bisecting the cephalic area. The abdomen is almost uniformly black and speckled with some minute light dots, with those near the anterior margin being larger. The legs are dark with the anterior surfaces of femora being pale while the remaining segments are uniformly black except tarsi which are dark brown. Total length is 12-13 mm.

== Conservation ==
Selenops zuluanus is listed as Least Concern by the South African National Biodiversity Institute due to its wide geographical range in southern Africa. The species is protected in uMkuzi Game Reserve, Ndumo Game Reserve, Kruger National Park and Lhuvhondo Nature Reserve.

== Taxonomy ==
The species was originally described by Lawrence in 1940 from Ingwavuma in KwaZulu-Natal. It was revised by Corronca in 2002. The species was temporarily transferred to the genus Anyphops by Benoit in 1968 but was returned to Selenops by Corronca in 1996.
