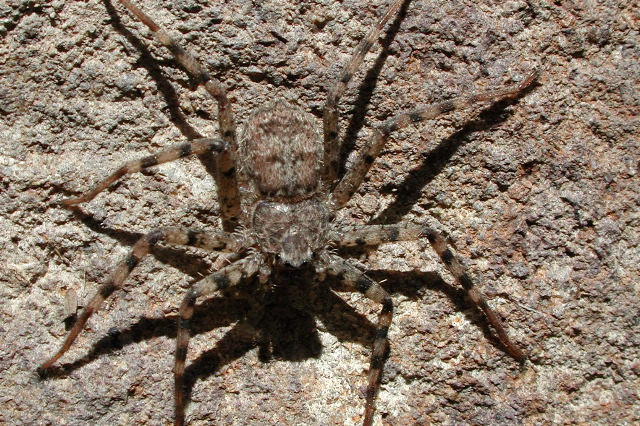
- Selenops sp.
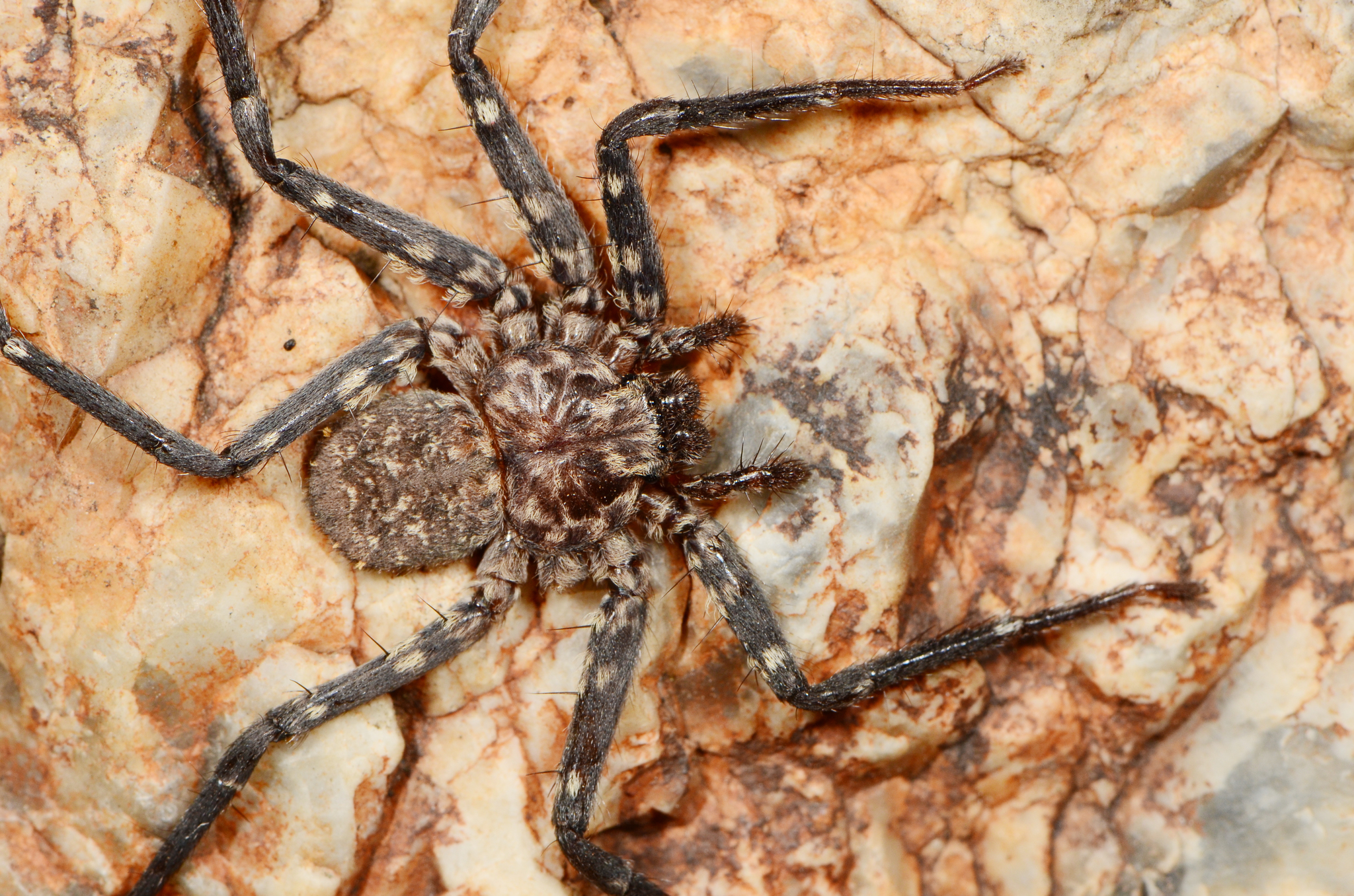
- Female S. ansieae

Scientific classification
- Kingdom: Animalia
- Phylum: Arthropoda
- Subphylum: Chelicerata
- Class: Arachnida
- Order: Araneae
- Infraorder: Araneomorphae
- Family: Selenopidae
- Genus: Selenops; Latreille, 1819

Diversity
- 132 species

= Selenops =

Selenops Temporal range: Palaeogene–present

Genus of spiders

Selenops is a spider genus that is found in many arid regions of the world, but some species may also be found in some cooler and even mountainous regions. Most of the 132 species (as of May. 2021) are hard to visually distinguish, and requires study of their finer anatomy.

S. australiensis is found on or under dry bark in Australia. The female reaches 9mm, the male 7mm. It looks superficially like a huntsman spider.

S. radiatus has proved to be an effective controlling agent of the potato tuber moth in South Africa.

Selenops is the first spider known to be able to steer and glide when falling, in order to land in or on a tree, instead of falling to the ground.

Selenops spiders are able to attack prey approaching from all directions. When attacking prey from behind, they show some of the fastest turning movements documented in terrestrial legged animals.

== Lifestyle ==
Selenops are free-living, agile spiders found on rocks, walls and tree trunks. With their very flattened bodies they are able to move into narrow crevices. Different species frequently occur sympatrically but occupy different microhabitats. The egg sac is round, flat, and papery and is attached to stones or bark.

== Description ==
Selenops differ from other selenopid genera by the arrangement of the eyes. The anterior median eyes, posterior median eyes and anterior lateral eyes align or are slightly recurved. Leg II is longer than leg IV and tibiae I and II have 2-2-2 ventral spines while metatarsi I-II have 2-2 spines.

These are small to large spiders measuring 6-23 mm in total length. The carapace is flattened and subcircular, usually brown to reddish brown with lateral dark bands or spots. The chelicerae are brown to orange, normally with black or grey bands. Labium and sternum are usually paler in colour. The abdomen is flattened, round to oval, clothed in dense setae, normally grey or yellowish with brown or black dorsal defined patterns. The venter is yellowish without markings.

Legs have two claws with claw tufts and scopulae. They are laterigrade spiders with anterior legs provided with strong, four to seven pairs of ventral spines on tibiae and metatarsi I and II. Tarsal claws are smooth and leg formulae are normally 4321.

== Name ==
The genus is named after the moon goddess Selene, and Greek -ops "eye", because of the moon-like form of the eyes.

== Taxonomy ==
The genus was studied by Lawrence (1940), Benoit (1968) and Corronca (2002, 2005).

== Species ==
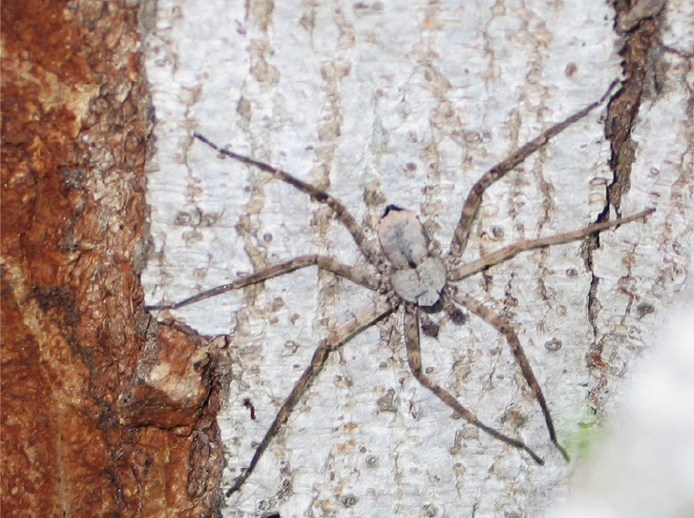
S. baweka

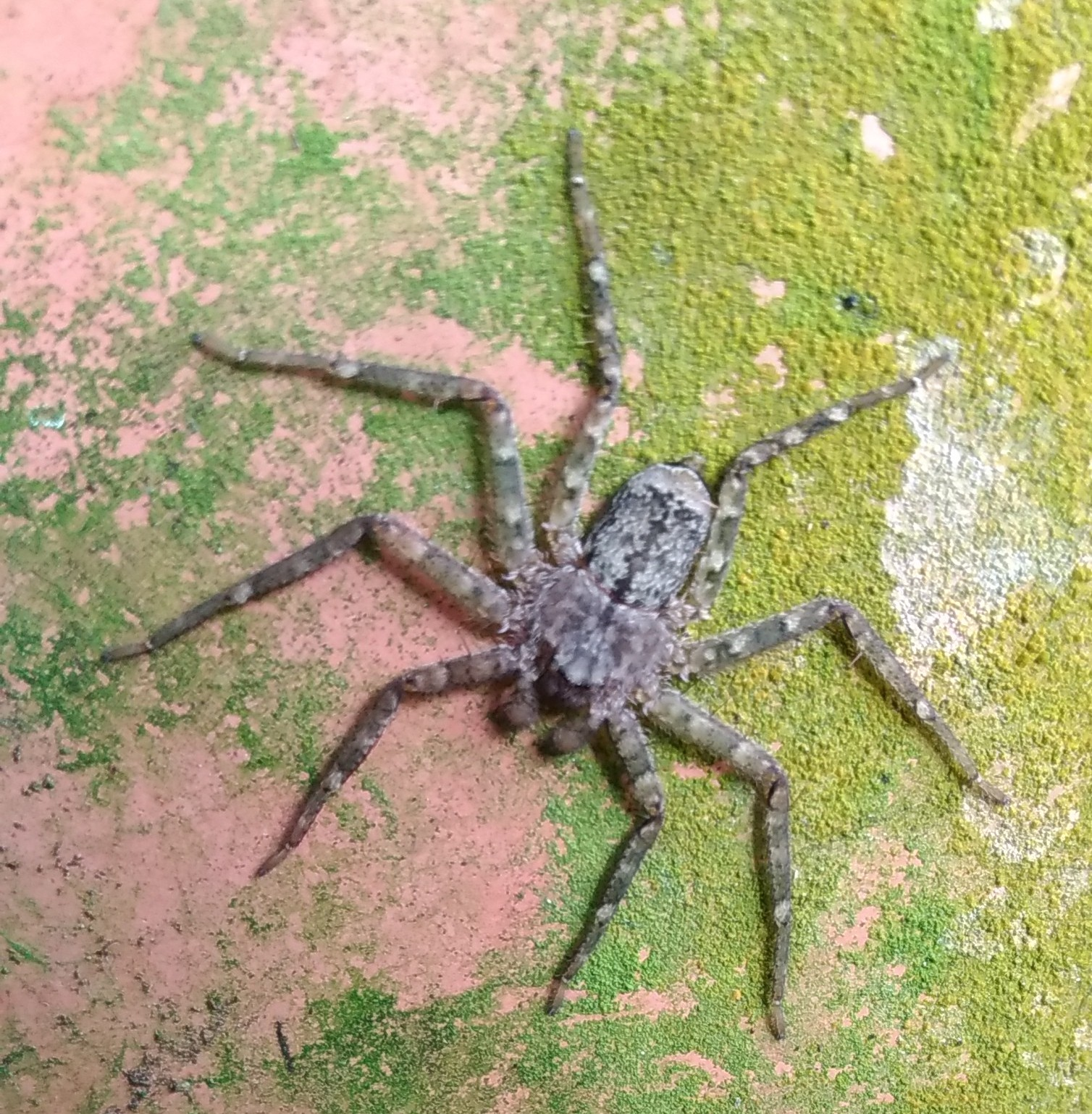
S. formosanus

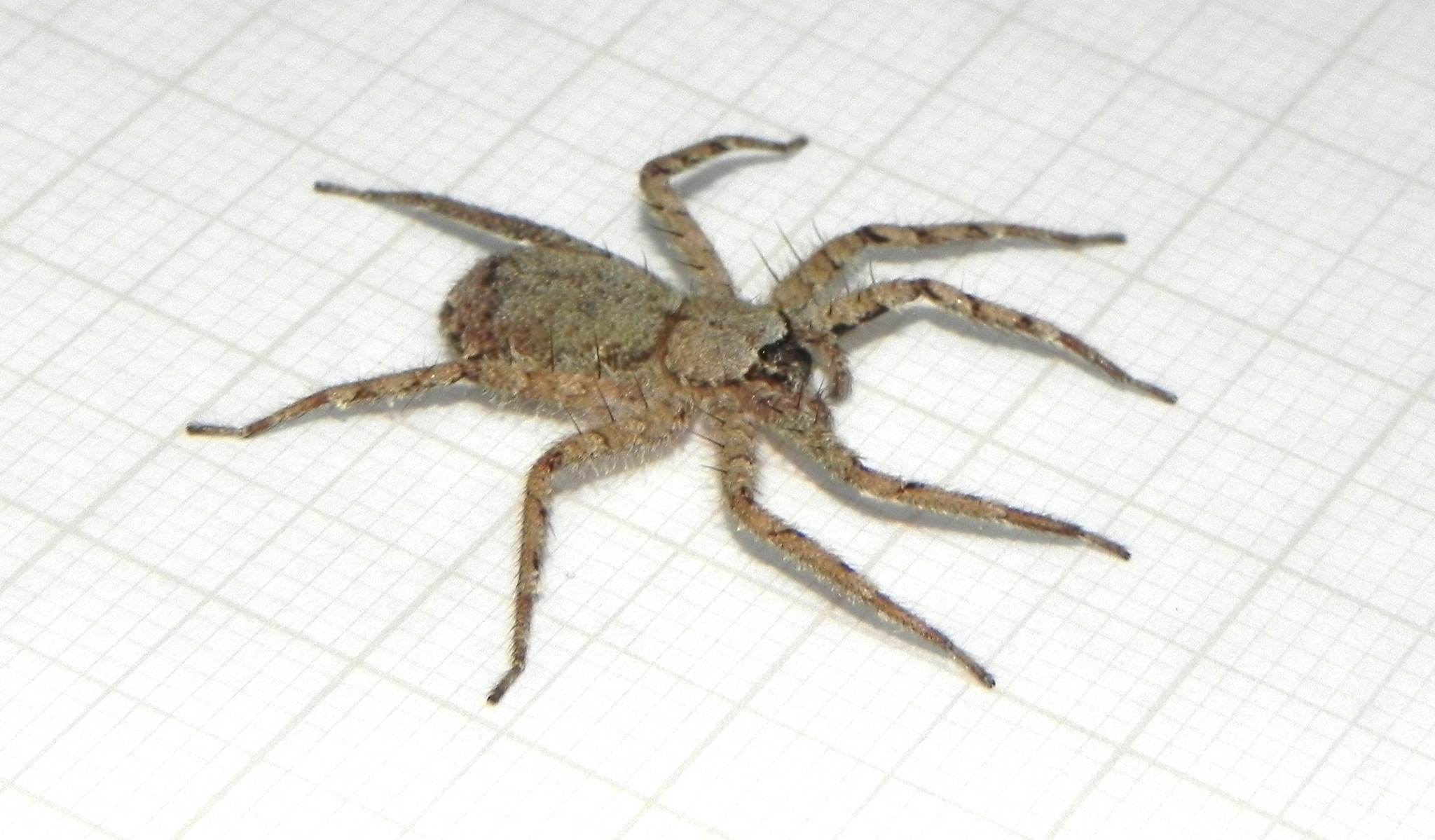
S. maranhensis

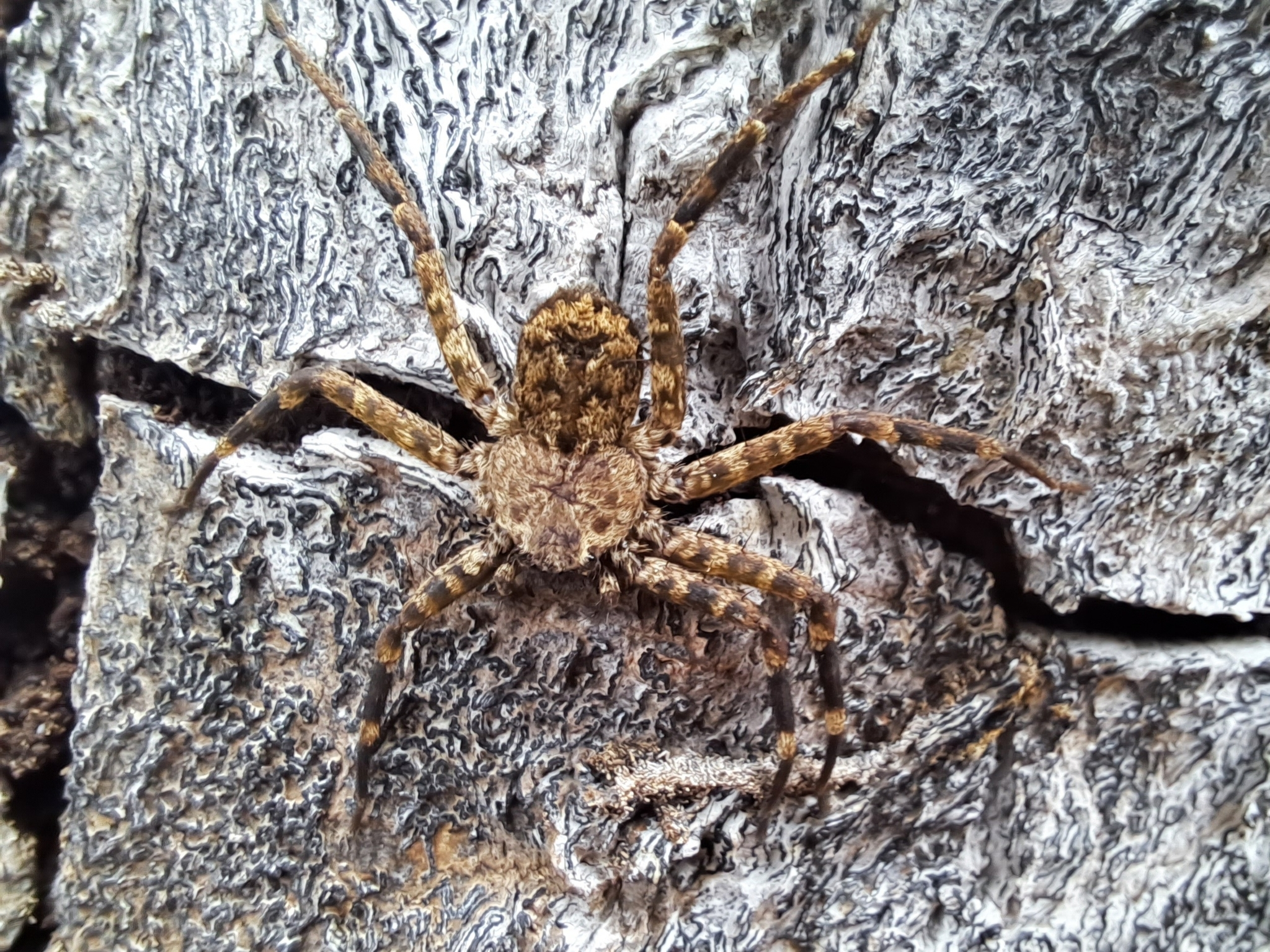
S. mexicanus

As of September 2025, this genus includes 132 species.

These species have articles on Wikipedia:

- Selenops ansieae Corronca, 2002 – South Africa
- Selenops brachycephalus Lawrence, 1940 – Zimbabwe, South Africa
- Selenops dilon Corronca, 2002 – South Africa
- Selenops feron Corronca, 2002 – Namibia, Zimbabwe, South Africa
- Selenops ilcuria Corronca, 2002 – Cameroon, South Africa
- Selenops insularis Keyserling, 1881 – United States, Greater Antilles
- Selenops intricatus Simon, 1910 – Senegal, Guinea-Bissau, DR Congo, South Africa
- Selenops lesnei Lessert, 1936 – Eritrea, Somalia, Rwanda, Burundi, Zimbabwe, Mozambique, South Africa
- Selenops lobatse Corronca, 2001 – South Africa
- Selenops ovambicus Lawrence, 1940 – Senegal, Cameroon, Sudan, Namibia, Botswana, Mozambique, South Africa
- Selenops radiatus Latreille, 1819 – Mediterranean, Africa, Middle East, India, Myanmar, China (type species)
- Selenops rosario Alayón, 2005 – Cuba
- Selenops submaculosus Bryant, 1940 – United States, Bahamas, Cuba, Cayman Islands
- Selenops tenebrosus Lawrence, 1940 – Zimbabwe, South Africa
- Selenops tonteldoos Corronca, 2005 – South Africa
- Selenops zuluanus Lawrence, 1940 – Botswana, Zimbabwe, South Africa

Complete species list as of September 2025
- Selenops ab Logunov & Jäger, 2015 – China, Vietnam
- Selenops abyssus Muma, 1953 – Mexico
- Selenops actophilus Chamberlin, 1924 – United States, Mexico
- Selenops aequalis Franganillo, 1935 – Cuba
- Selenops aissus Walckenaer, 1837 – United States, Bahamas, Cuba
- Selenops alemani Muma, 1953 – Cuba
- Selenops amona Crews, 2011 – Puerto Rico
- Selenops anacaona Crews, 2018 – Hispaniola (Dominican Rep.)
- Selenops angelae Corronca, 1998 – Ecuador
- Selenops angolaensis Corronca, 2002 – Angola
- Selenops annulatus Simon, 1876 – Cameroon, Tanzania
- Selenops ansieae Corronca, 2002 – South Africa
- Selenops arikok Crews, 2011 – Aruba
- Selenops aztecus Valdez-Mondragón, 2010 – Mexico
- Selenops bani Alayón, 1992 – Hispaniola
- Selenops banksi Muma, 1953 – Panama, Ecuador, Peru, Guyana, Brazil
- Selenops bastet Zamani & Crews, 2019 – Egypt
- Selenops baweka Crews, 2011 – Turks and Caicos Islands
- Selenops bifurcatus Banks, 1909 – Guatemala, Costa Rica
- Selenops bocacanadensis Crews, 2011 – Hispaniola (Dominican Rep.)
- Selenops brachycephalus Lawrence, 1940 – Zimbabwe, South Africa
- Selenops bullerengue Crews, Torres & Galvis, 2021 – Colombia
- Selenops bursarius Karsch, 1879 – Korea, China, Taiwan, Japan
- Selenops buscki Muma, 1953 – Panama
- Selenops cabagan Alayón, 2005 – Cuba
- Selenops camerun Corronca, 2001 – Cameroon
- Selenops canasta Alayón, 2005 – Cuba
- Selenops candidus Muma, 1953 – Jamaica
- Selenops caney Alayón, 2005 – Cuba
- Selenops caonabo Crews, 2018 – Hispaniola (Dominican Rep.)
- Selenops chamela Crews, 2011 – Mexico
- Selenops cocheleti Simon, 1880 – Panama, Argentina
- Selenops comorensis Schmidt & Krause, 1994 – Comoros
- Selenops crewsae Lin & Li, 2021 – China
- Selenops cristis Corronca, 2002 – Ghana, Namibia
- Selenops curazao Alayón, 2001 – Curaçao, Bonaire
- Selenops curruganja Crews & Galvis, 2021 – Colombia
- Selenops debilis Banks, 1898 – United States, Mexico
- Selenops denia Crews, 2011 – Hispaniola
- Selenops dilamen Corronca, 2002 – DR Congo
- Selenops dilon Corronca, 2002 – South Africa
- Selenops duan Crews, 2011 – Hispaniola
- Selenops ducke Corronca, 1996 – Brazil
- Selenops dufouri Vinson, 1863 – Madagascar, Réunion
- Selenops ecuadorensis Berland, 1913 – Ecuador
- Selenops ef Jäger, 2019 – Cambodia
- Selenops enriquillo Crews, 2011 – Jamaica, Hispaniola
- Selenops feron Corronca, 2002 – Namibia, Zimbabwe, South Africa
- Selenops florenciae Corronca, 2002 – Angola
- Selenops formosus Bryant, 1940 – Cuba
- Selenops geraldinae Corronca, 1996 – Colombia, Venezuela, Trinidad, Brazil
- Selenops gracilis Muma, 1953 – Mexico
- Selenops guerrero Crews, 2011 – Hispaniola
- Selenops hebraicus Mello-Leitão, 1945 – Brazil, Paraguay, Argentina
- Selenops huetocatl Crews, 2011 – Mexico
- Selenops iberia Alayón, 2005 – Cuba
- Selenops ilcuria Corronca, 2002 – Cameroon, South Africa
- Selenops imias Alayón, 2005 – Cuba
- Selenops insularis Keyserling, 1881 – United States, Greater Antilles
- Selenops intricatus Simon, 1910 – Senegal, Guinea-Bissau, DR Congo, South Africa
- Selenops isopodus Mello-Leitão, 1941 – Colombia, Venezuela
- Selenops ivohibe Corronca, 2005 – Madagascar
- Selenops ixchel Crews, 2011 – Mexico
- Selenops jocquei Corronca, 2005 – Ivory Coast
- Selenops juxtlahuaca Valdez, 2007 – Mexico
- Selenops kalinago Crews, 2011 – Lesser Antilles
- Selenops krugeri Lawrence, 1940 – Nigeria, Angola, Zambia, Namibia, Botswana, Zimbabwe, South Africa
- Selenops lavillai Corronca, 1996 – Colombia, Venezuela, Peru, Brazil
- Selenops lepidus Muma, 1953 – Mexico
- Selenops lesnei Lessert, 1936 – Eritrea, Somalia, Rwanda, Burundi, Zimbabwe, Mozambique, South Africa
- Selenops levii Corronca, 1997 – Brazil
- Selenops lindborgi Petrunkevitch, 1926 – Caribbean
- Selenops littoricola Strand, 1913 – Central Africa
- Selenops lobatse Corronca, 2001 – South Africa
- Selenops lucibel Corronca, 2002 – Southern Africa
- Selenops lumbo Corronca, 2001 – East Africa
- Selenops makimaki Crews, 2011 – Mexico
- Selenops malinalxochitl Crews, 2011 – Mexico
- Selenops manzanoae Corronca, 1997 – Brazil
- Selenops maranhensis Mello-Leitão, 1918 – Brazil, Bolivia, Paraguay, Argentina
- Selenops marcanoi Alayón, 1992 – Hispaniola
- Selenops marginalis F. O. Pickard-Cambridge, 1900 – Mexico
- Selenops melanurus Mello-Leitão, 1923 – Brazil
- Selenops mexicanus Keyserling, 1880 – United States, Colombia, Galapagos
- Selenops micropalpus Muma, 1953 – Lesser Antilles (Dominica, Martinique, Saint Lucia, Saint Vincent and the Grenadines)
- Selenops minutus F. O. Pickard-Cambridge, 1900 – Mexico, Guatemala
- Selenops morosus Banks, 1898 – Mexico
- Selenops morro Crews, 2011 – Hispaniola (Dominican Rep.)
- Selenops muehlmannorum Jäger & Praxaysombath, 2011 – Laos
- Selenops nesophilus Chamberlin, 1924 – United States, Mexico
- Selenops nigromaculatus Keyserling, 1880 – Mexico
- Selenops occultus Mello-Leitão, 1918 – Brazil, Paraguay, Argentina
- Selenops oculatus Pocock, 1898 – Yemen
- Selenops ollarius Zhu, Sha & Chen, 1990 – China
- Selenops onka Corronca, 2005 – Angola, Namibia
- Selenops oricuajo Crews, 2011 – Costa Rica
- Selenops ovambicus Lawrence, 1940 – Senegal, Cameroon, Sudan, Namibia, Botswana, Mozambique, South Africa
- Selenops oviedo Crews, 2011 – Hispaniola
- Selenops para Corronca, 1996 – Brazil
- Selenops pensilis Muma, 1953 – Hispaniola (Haiti, Dominican Rep.)
- Selenops peraltae Corronca, 1997 – Bolivia
- Selenops petenajtoy Crews, 2011 – Guatemala
- Selenops petrunkevitchi Alayón, 2003 – Jamaica
- Selenops phaselus Muma, 1953 – Hispaniola
- Selenops pygmaeus Benoit, 1975 – Ivory Coast, Congo
- Selenops radiatus Latreille, 1819 – Mediterranean, Africa, Middle East, India, Myanmar, China (type species)
- Selenops rapax Mello-Leitão, 1929 – Brazil, Argentina
- Selenops rosario Alayón, 2005 – Cuba
- Selenops sabulosus Benoit, 1968 – Djibouti
- Selenops saldali Corronca, 2002 – Ghana, Nigeria
- Selenops scitus Muma, 1953 – Mexico
- Selenops secretus Hirst, 1911 – Seychelles
- Selenops siboney Alayón, 2005 – Cuba
- Selenops simius Muma, 1953 – Bahamas, Cuba, Cayman Islands
- Selenops souliga Crews, 2011 – Lesser Antilles (Anguilla, Saint-Martin, Sint Maarten, Saint Barthélemy)
- Selenops spixi Perty, 1833 – Brazil, Uruguay, Argentina
- Selenops submaculosus Bryant, 1940 – United States, Bahamas, Cuba, Cayman Is.
- Selenops tenebrosus Lawrence, 1940 – Zimbabwe, South Africa
- Selenops tiky Corronca, 1998 – Venezuela
- Selenops tomsici Corronca, 1996 – Peru
- Selenops tonteldoos Corronca, 2005 – South Africa
- Selenops trifidus Bryant, 1948 – Caribbean (Navassa Is.)
- Selenops vigilans Pocock, 1898 – West, Central, East Africa, Madagascar
- Selenops vinalesi Muma, 1953 – Cuba
- Selenops viron Corronca, 2002 – Kenya
- Selenops willinki Corronca, 1996 – Trinidad
- Selenops wilmotorum Crews, 2011 – Jamaica
- Selenops wilsoni Crews, 2011 – Jamaica
- Selenops ximenae Corronca, 1997 – Brazil
- Selenops zairensis Benoit, 1968 – Congo, Ivory Coast, Angola
- Selenops zuluanus Lawrence, 1940 – Botswana, Zimbabwe, South Africa
- Selenops zumac Corronca, 1996 – Brazil
