= Selenops ovambicus =

Ovambicus Selenops Flat Spider

Conservation status
- Least Concern (SANBI Red List)

Scientific classification
- Kingdom: Animalia
- Phylum: Arthropoda
- Subphylum: Chelicerata
- Class: Arachnida
- Order: Araneae
- Infraorder: Araneomorphae
- Family: Selenopidae
- Genus: Selenops
- Species: S. ovambicus

Binomial name
- Selenops ovambicus Lawrence, 1940

Species of spider

Selenops ovambicus is a species of spider in the family Selenopidae. It is found in Senegal, Cameroon, Sudan, Namibia, Botswana, Mozambique and South Africa and is commonly known as the Ovambicus Selenops flat spider.

== Distribution ==
Selenops ovambicus is found in Senegal, Cameroon, Sudan, Namibia, Botswana, Mozambique and South Africa. In South Africa, it is known from Limpopo at 418 m above sea level.

== Habitat and ecology ==
The species inhabits the Savanna biome and is a free-living cryptozoic nocturnal ground living spider.

== Description ==
Known from only the female. Carapace reddish brown, cephalic portion a little darker than thoracic portion, defined at its posterior apex by two short blackish stripes, a narrow incomplete blackish stripe in the middle. Thoracic portion with some submarginal spots, radiations from the thoracic striae short and ill-defined, the striae itself deeply grooved and blackish. Mandibles blackish brown, ocular area dark. Abdomen much macerated. Femora of anterior legs with 2 distinct blackish bands on their anterior surfaces, these confluent along the under sides. Anterior tibiae with 2 black and 2 lighter bands. Labium blackish brown, sternum narrowly margined with black. Total length 13.4 mm.

== Conservation ==
Selenops ovambicus is listed as Least Concern by the South African National Biodiversity Institute due to its wide geographical range in Africa. The species is protected in Kruger National Park.

== Taxonomy ==
The species was originally described by Lawrence in 1940 from Namibia. It was revised by Corronca in 2002.
