= Selenops ilcuria =

Ellisras Selenops Flat Spider

Conservation status
- Least Concern (SANBI Red List)

Scientific classification
- Kingdom: Animalia
- Phylum: Arthropoda
- Subphylum: Chelicerata
- Class: Arachnida
- Order: Araneae
- Infraorder: Araneomorphae
- Family: Selenopidae
- Genus: Selenops
- Species: S. ilcuria

Binomial name
- Selenops ilcuria Corronca, 2002

Species of spider

Selenops ilcuria is a species of spider in the family Selenopidae. It is found in Cameroon and South Africa and is commonly known as the Ellisras Selenops flat spider.

== Distribution ==
Selenops ilcuria is found in Cameroon and South Africa. In South Africa, it occurs in Limpopo and Mpumalanga provinces at altitudes ranging from 1,001 to 1,346 m above sea level.

== Habitat and ecology ==
The species inhabits the Savanna biome and is a free-living cryptozoic nocturnal ground living spider.

== Description ==
Known only from female. Carapace and chelicerae dark reddish-brown. Legs brown with femora having three and tibiae having two dark grey incomplete rings. Abdomen with tufts of white hairs, colour pattern pale yellowish-brown with small black spots, venter yellowish. Total length 11.20 mm.

== Conservation ==
Selenops ilcuria is listed as Least Concern by the South African National Biodiversity Institute due to its wide geographical range in Africa. The species is protected in Loskop Dam Nature Reserve.

== Taxonomy ==
The species was described by Corronca in 2002 from Marken near Ellisras in Limpopo Province. The species has also been sampled from Cameroon and is probably under sampled and expected to occur in more countries in between.
