= Selenops dilon =

Nelspruit Selenops Flat Spider

Conservation status
- Least Concern (SANBI Red List)

Scientific classification
- Kingdom: Animalia
- Phylum: Arthropoda
- Subphylum: Chelicerata
- Class: Arachnida
- Order: Araneae
- Infraorder: Araneomorphae
- Family: Selenopidae
- Genus: Selenops
- Species: S. dilon

Binomial name
- Selenops dilon Corronca, 2002

Species of spider

Selenops dilon is a species of spider in the family Selenopidae. It is endemic to South Africa and is commonly known as the Nelspruit Selenops Flat Spider.

== Distribution ==
Selenops dilon is found in Limpopo and Mpumalanga provinces in South Africa at altitudes ranging from 292 to 677 m above sea level.

== Habitat and ecology ==
The species inhabits the Savanna biome and is a free-living cryptozoic nocturnal ground living spider. The species has also been sampled in citrus orchards.

== Description ==
Known from only the female. Carapace reddish-brown. Chelicerae dark brown-red. Legs brown with tibiae, metatarsi and tarsi darker. Femora I-IV with pale brown prolateral band and a circular prolateral distal area with white hairs. Abdomen brown-yellow with dark spots, venter pale brown. Total length 14.00 mm.

== Conservation ==
Selenops dilon is listed as Least Concern by the South African National Biodiversity Institute. Much natural habitat remains within its range and it is likely to be under sampled. The species is protected in Kruger National Park.

== Taxonomy ==
The species was described by Corronca in 2002 from Nelspruit in Mpumalanga.
