= Selenops rosario =

Scientific classification
- Domain: Eukaryota
- Kingdom: Animalia
- Phylum: Arthropoda
- Subphylum: Chelicerata
- Class: Arachnida
- Order: Araneae
- Infraorder: Araneomorphae
- Family: Selenopidae
- Genus: Selenops
- Species: S. rosario

Binomial name
- Selenops rosario G. G. Alayón, 2005

Species of spider

Selenops rosario is a species of spider from the family Selenopidae. The scientific name of this species was first published in 2005 by G. G. Alayón. Its native habitat is in Cuba.
