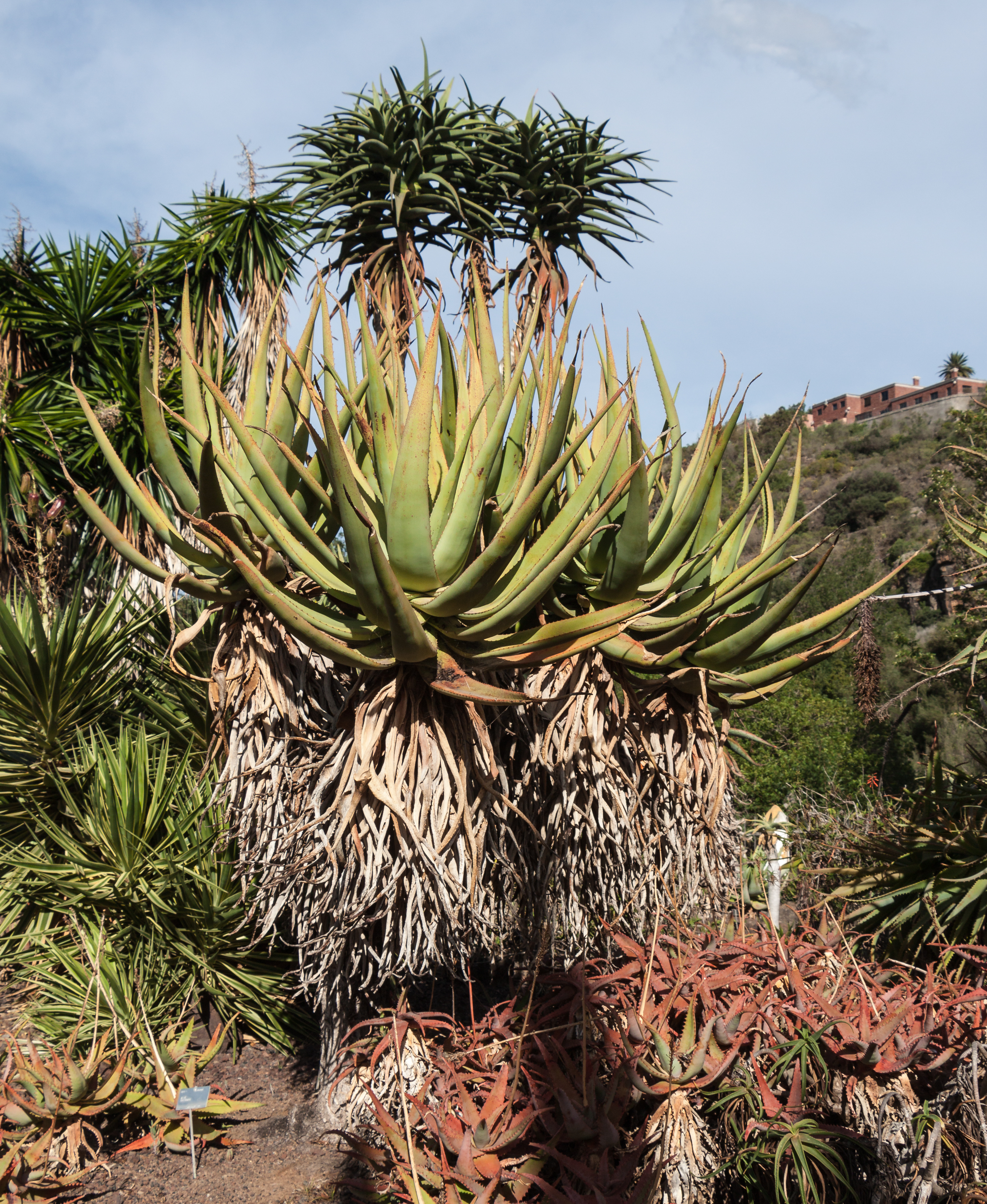

Conservation status
- CITES Appendix II (CITES)

Scientific classification
- Kingdom: Plantae
- Clade: Tracheophytes
- Clade: Angiosperms
- Clade: Monocots
- Order: Asparagales
- Family: Asphodelaceae
- Subfamily: Asphodeloideae
- Genus: Aloe
- Species: A. castanea

Binomial name
- Aloe castanea Schönland

= Aloe castanea =

Species of succulent

Aloe castanea (Cat's tail Aloe) is a species of aloe endemic to South Africa. It grows to about 15 ft (4.6 m) in height, with a single stem that may become branched in the upper portion, with clusters of small, dark, orange-brown flowers.
