= Lesedi Cultural Village =

Southern African cultural village near Johannesburg

Coordinates: 25°50′16″S 27°52′57″E

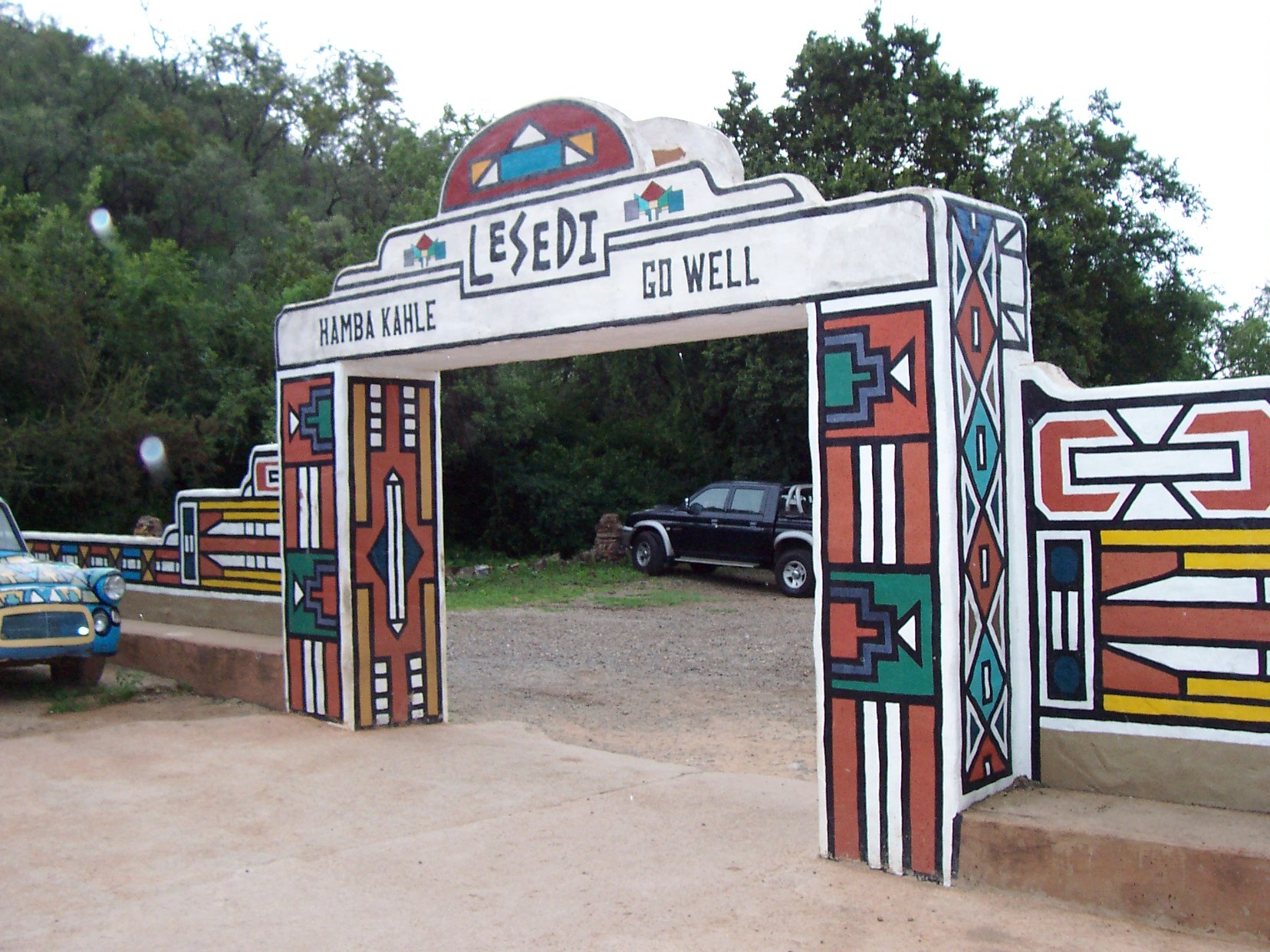
Exit at Lesedi Village

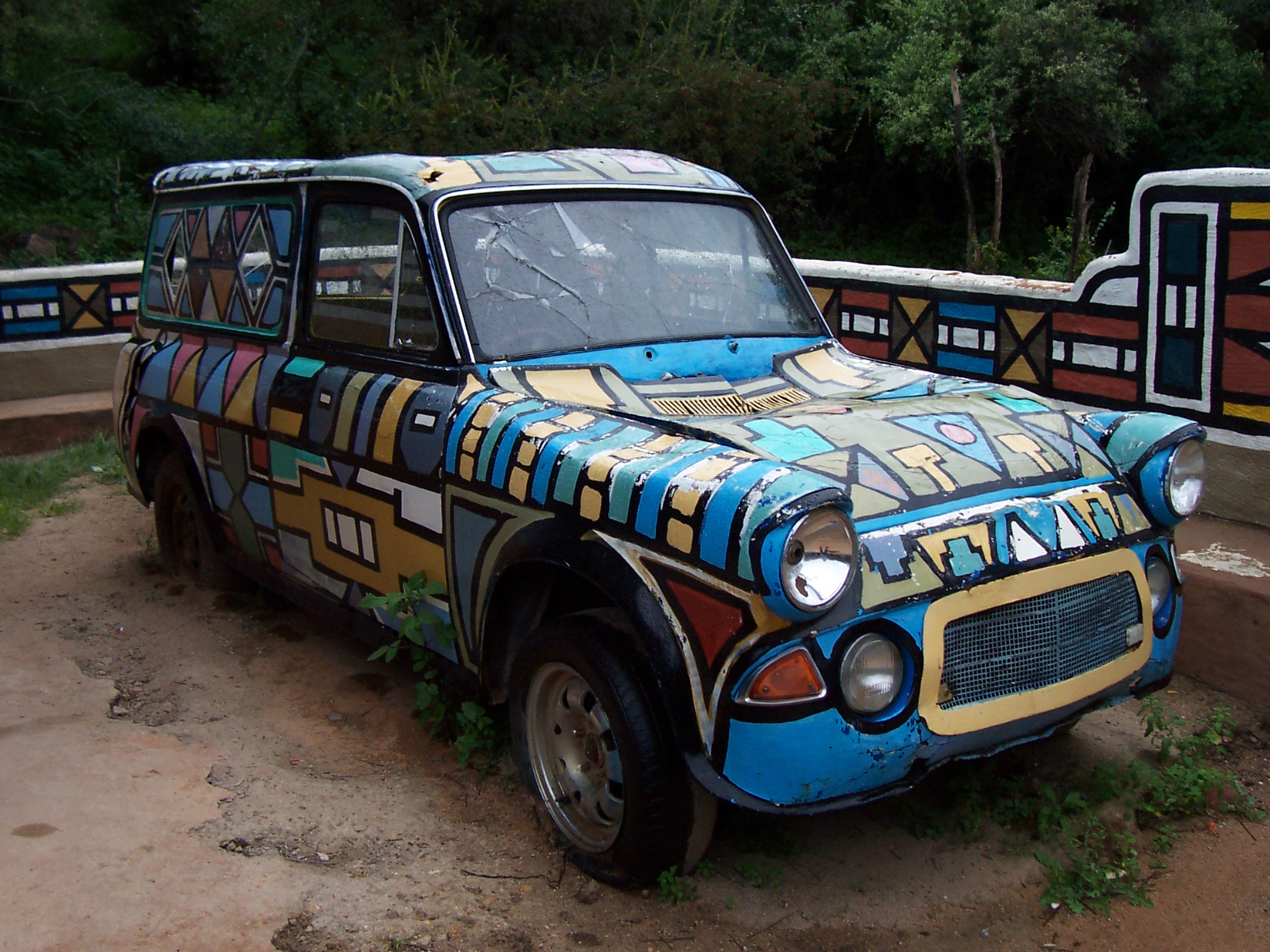
This car shows the color scheme that is used throughout the village.

Lesedi Cultural Village is a tourist village which celebrates the cultural traditions of several different peoples of Southern Africa. It reproduces traditional dwellings and offers demonstrations of dances and other cultural activities. It is situated near Johannesburg, within the Cradle of Humankind, in Gauteng, South Africa. During the COVID-19 pandemic it was closed for 2 years, until its reopen on 2022.

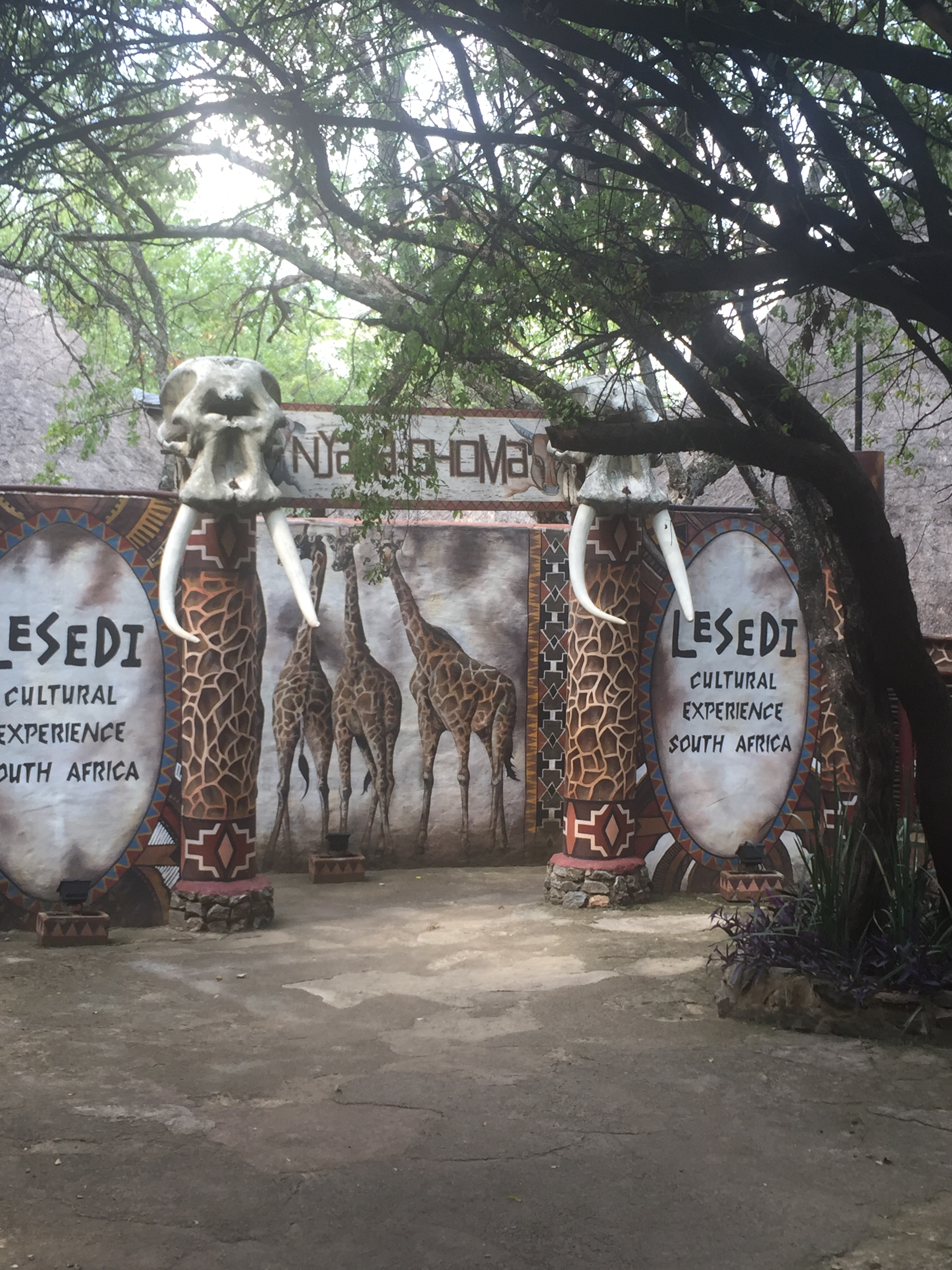
Entrance to Lesedi Cultural Village, South Africa

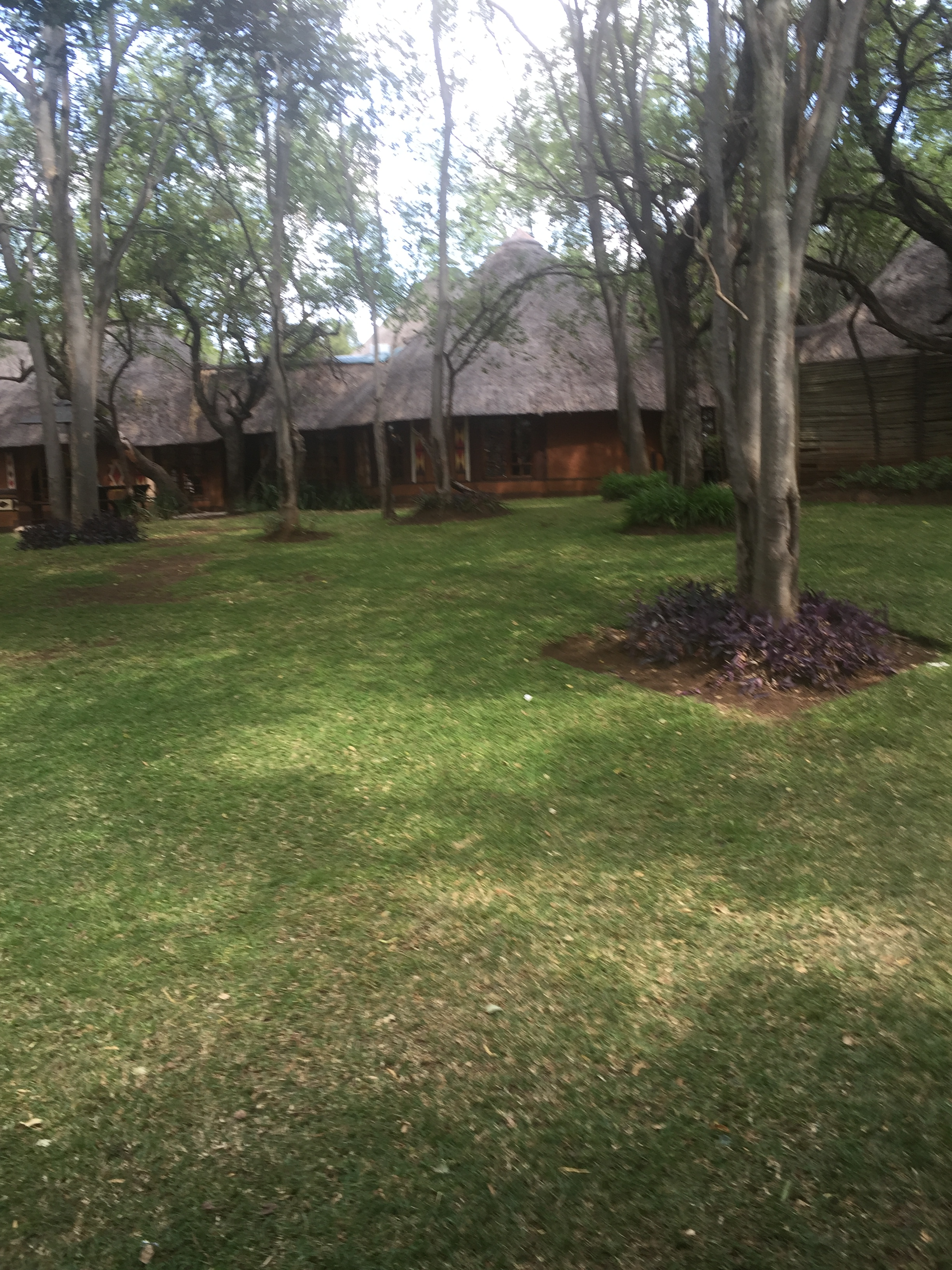
Thatched buildings at Lesedi Cultural Village, South Africa

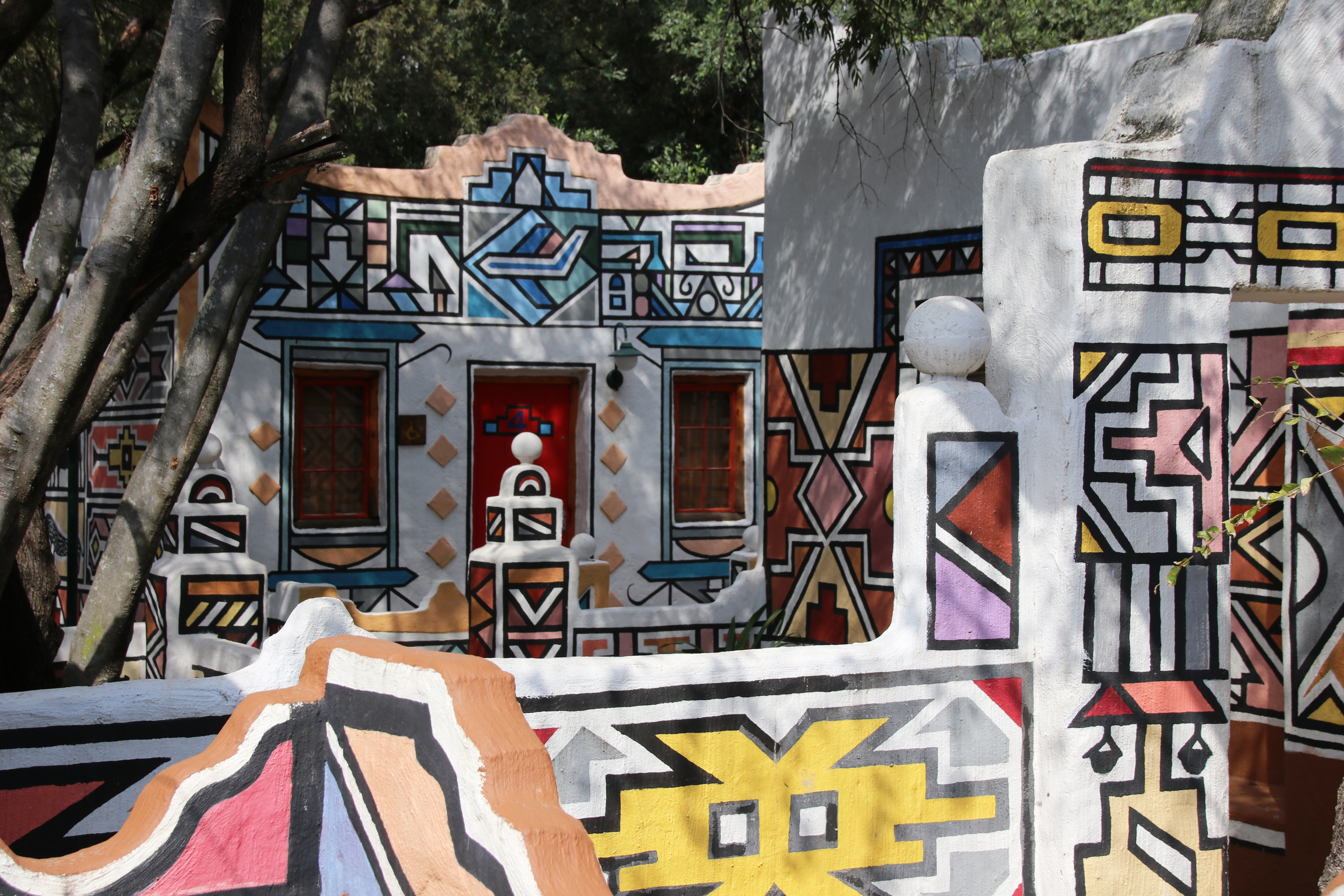
Traditional Ndebele houses at Lesedi Cultural Village

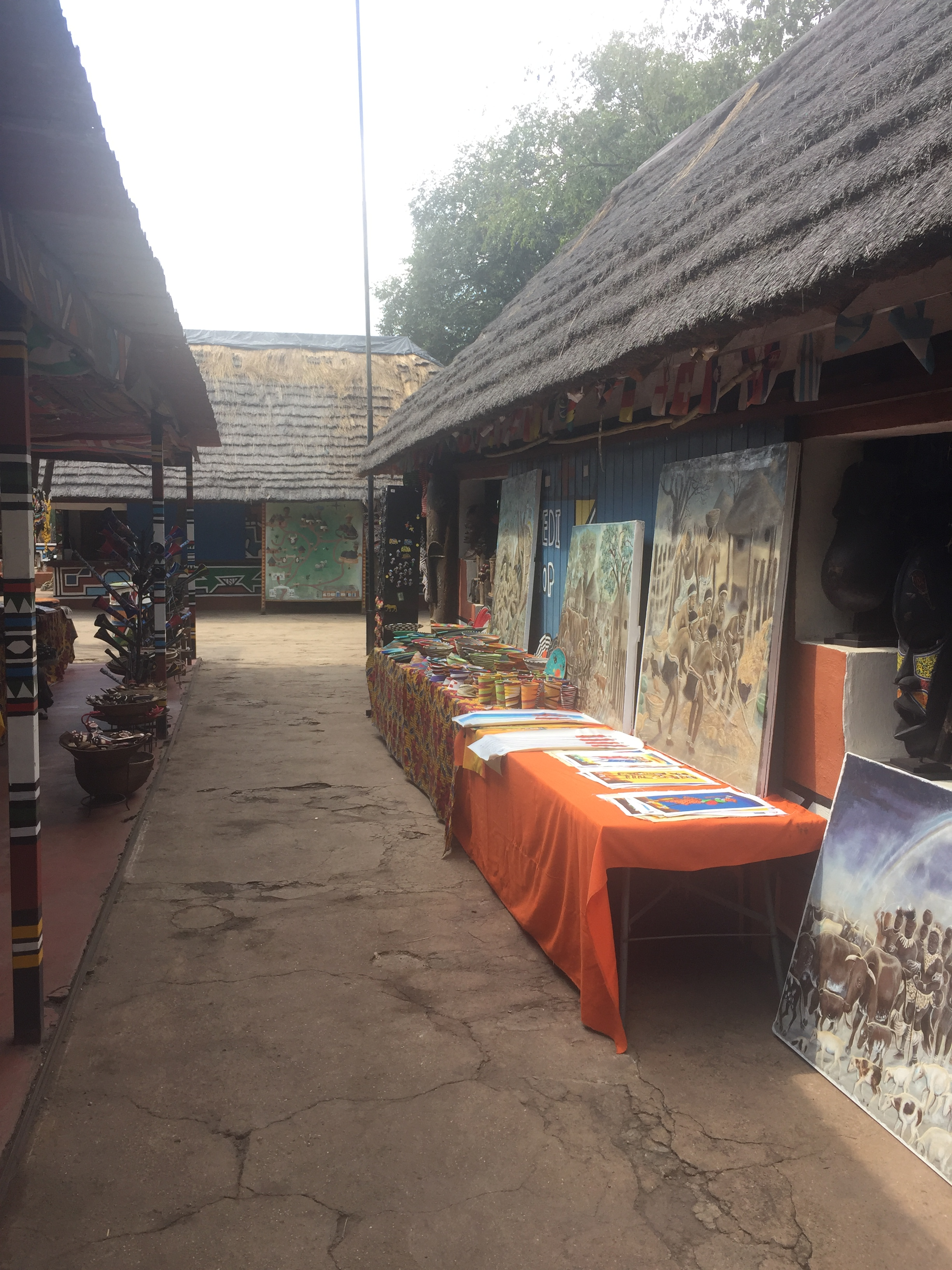
Reception and retail area at Lesedi Cultural Village
