= Laersdrif =

Laersdrift
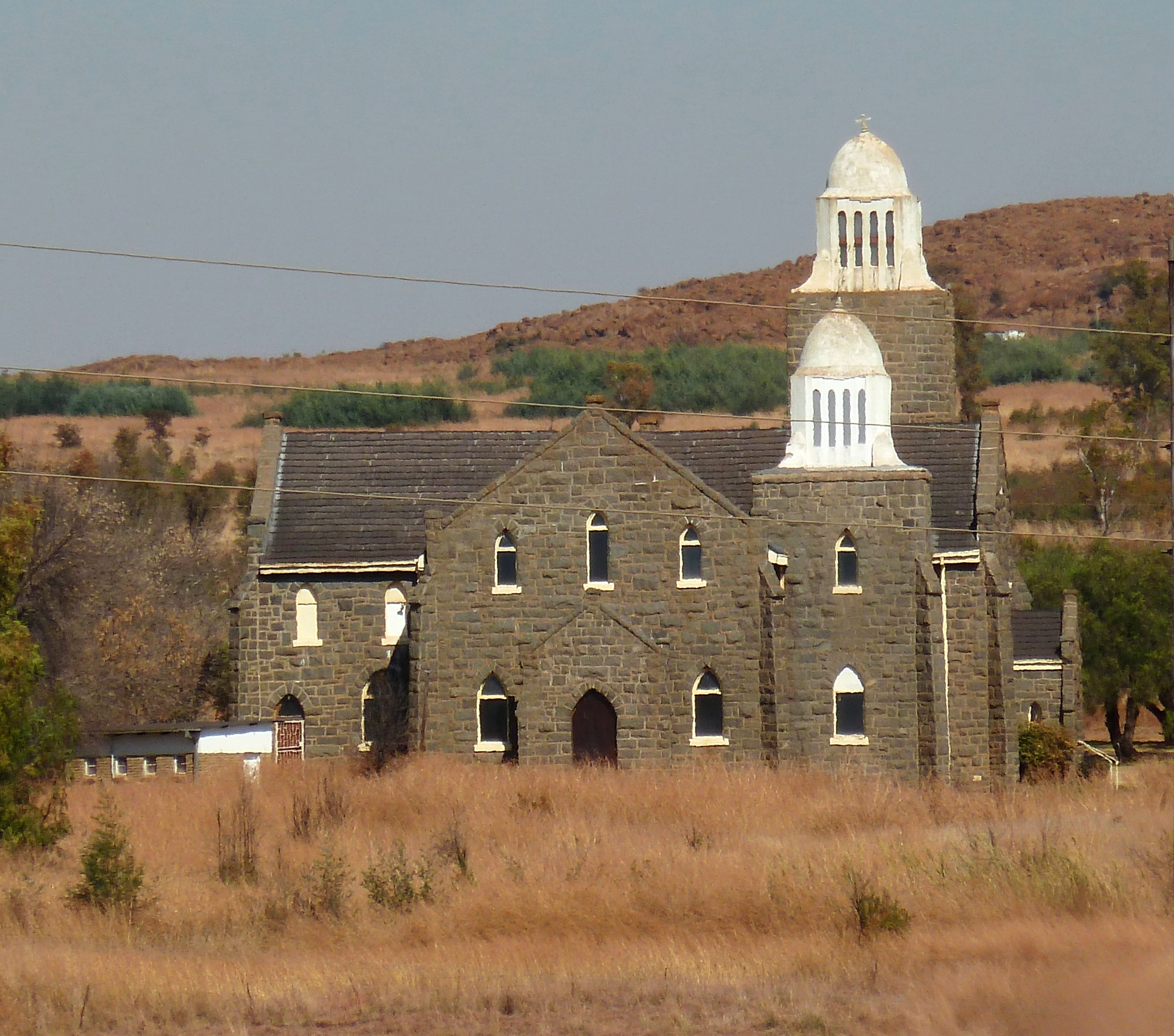
- NG stone church at Laersdrif

- Location within Limpopo Location within South Africa
- Coordinates: 25.366°S 29.857°E
- Country: South Africa
- Province: Limpopo
- District: Sekhukhune
- Municipality: Elias Motsoaledi
- Established: 1907

Area
  - Total: 4.06 km^{2} (1.57 sq mi)
- Elevation: 1,474 m (4,836 ft)

Population (2011)
  - Total: 2,218
  - Density: 546/km^{2} (1,410/sq mi)

Racial makeup (2011)
  - Black African: 96.1%
  - Coloured: 0.9%
  - Indian/Asian: 0.5%
  - White: 2.6%

First languages (2011)
  - Northern Sotho: 49.1%
  - S. Ndebele: 38.0%
  - Zulu: 4.7%
  - Afrikaans: 3.6%
  - Other: 4.6%
- Time zone: UTC+2 (SAST)
- Postal code (street): 1065
- PO box: 1065
- Area code: 013

Laersdrift (formerly Delagersdrift) is a small settlement in Elias Motsoaledi Local Municipality in the Limpopo province of South Africa. It is situated on the Laersdrifspruit, a tributary of the upper Steelpoort River, 27 km southwest of Roossenekal, 72 km northeast of Middelburg and 11 km north east of Stoffberg.

== History ==
It was founded in 1907 on the farms Swartkoppies and De Lagersdrift, and proclaimed a township on 8 July 1953. It takes its name from the latter farm, which in turn was named after a ford (Afrikaans: drif, Dutch: drift) at which a Boer commando laagered during the Mapoch War of 1882; a laager is laer in Afrikaans.
