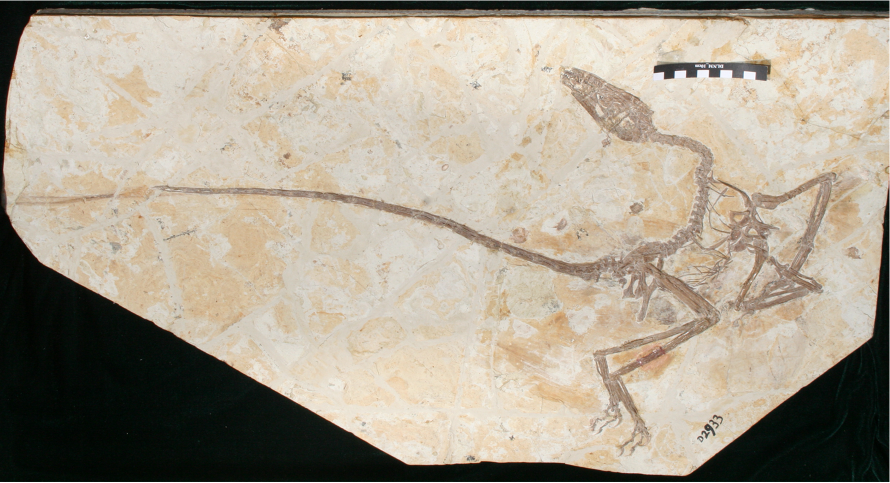
- Holotype specimen

Scientific classification
- Kingdom: Animalia
- Phylum: Chordata
- Class: Reptilia
- Clade: Dinosauria
- Clade: Saurischia
- Clade: Theropoda
- Family: †Dromaeosauridae
- Clade: †Microraptoria
- Genus: †Wulong; Poust et al., 2020
- Species: †W. bohaiensis

Binomial name
- †Wulong bohaiensis Poust et al., 2020

= Wulong bohaiensis =

Wulong bohaiensis Temporal range: Early Cretaceous (Aptian) 120.3 Ma

Species of dromaeosaurid dinosaur

Wulong bohaiensis (meaning "dancing dragon") is an extinct species of microraptorine dromaeosaurid dinosaur known from the Early Cretaceous (Aptian) Jiufotang Formation of China. It is the only species in the genus Wulong, known from the complete skeleton of a juvenile preserving feather traces.

== Discovery ==
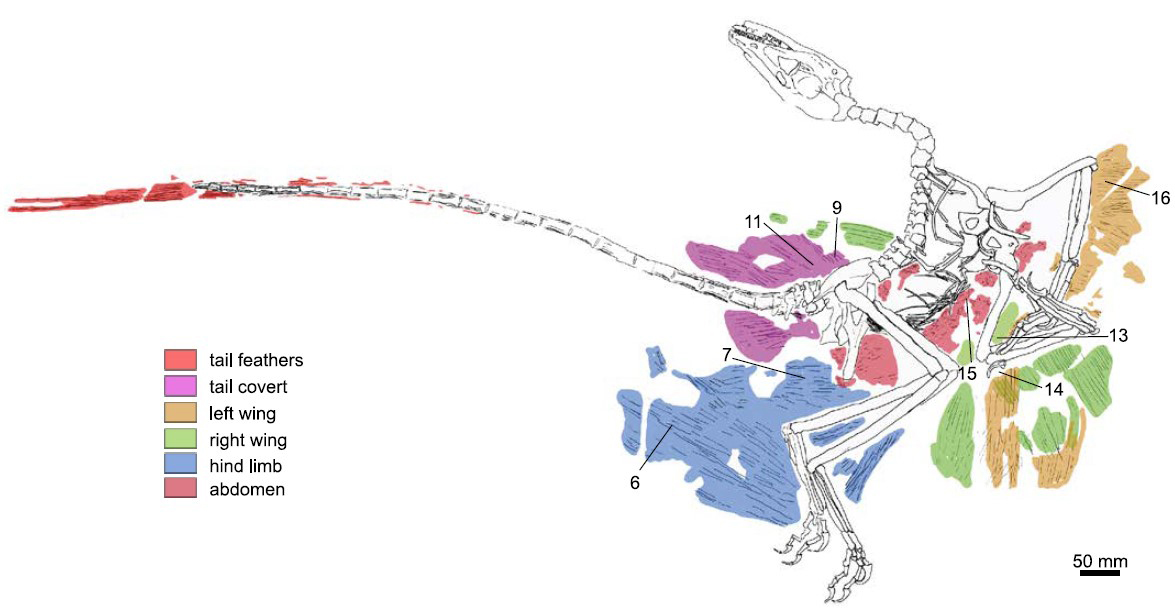
Diagram of the preserved plumage

The Wulong bohaiensis holotype specimen, DNHM D2933, was found by a farmer in layers of the fossil-rich Jiufotang Formation (Shangheshou locality) of Chaoyang, Liaoning Province, China. The fossil, housed at the Dalian Natural History Museum in Liaoning, consists of a complete, articulated specimen with preserved feathers. In 2014, Ashley William Poust analyzed the skeleton, naming it "Wulong bohaiensis" in a thesis. This name remained an invalid nomen ex dissertatione.

In 2020, Poust alongside his former advisor David Varricchio from Montana State University and Dalian paleontologists Gao Chunling, Wu Jianlin, and Zhang Fengjiao validly named and described the type species Wulong bohaiensis. The generic name, "Wulong", is derived from the Chinese 舞, wǔ, meaning "dancing", in reference to the specimen's "sprightly pose and inferred nimble habits", and 龍/龙, lóng, meaning "dragon". The specific name, "bohaiensis", refers to the museum housing the specimen, located near the Bohai Strait (渤海, Bó Hǎi).

== Description ==
The proportionally long tail of Wulong is about twice as long as its body. The skeleton has hollow bones. The remains belong to a juvenile individual, about one-year-old.

The long, narrow skull of Wulong is large in relation to the body. It is 1.15 times the length of the femur. Its thin jaws are filled with small and sharp teeth. The lightly-built premaxilla—a pair of small bones at the end of the upper jaw—is relatively dorsoventrally short for a dromaeosaurid. The quadratojugal of most dromaeosaurids is T-shaped, but in Wulong this bone is tiny and L‐shaped. The ascending process is about 6 mm tall, and the jugal process is 5 mm long.

=== Feathers and colouration ===
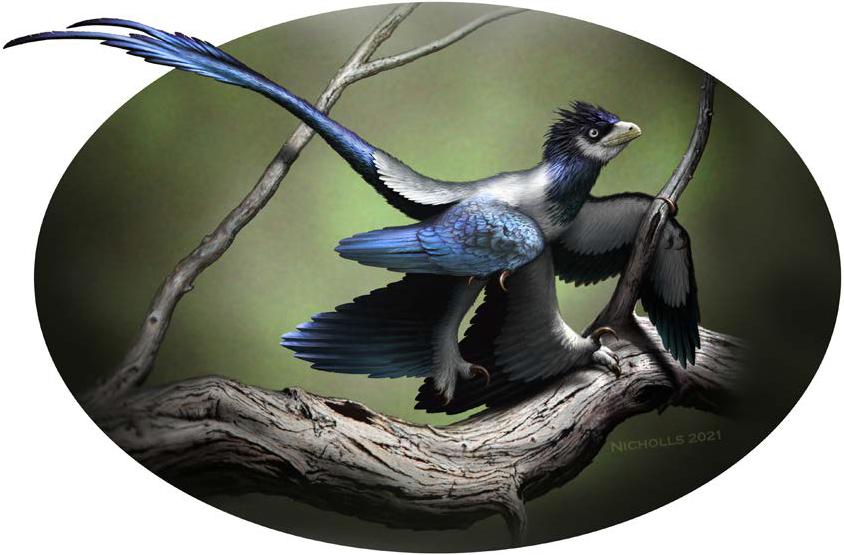
Life restoration with colouration inferred from the holotype

The specimen displays soft tissue preservation, including feathered wings on its arms and legs, and two long plumes at the end of the tail, similar to the extinct Microraptor and Confuciusornis and the extant quetzal. However unlike the related Microraptor, there is no evidence that Wulong had a fan of feathers at the end of the tail. The long pair tail feathers present in an immature individual suggests that they were likely not used for mating, and possibly not other ornamental purposes.

In 2023, Croudace and colleagues described the likely plumage colouration of the holotype. They indicated the presence of iridescent feathers on the forelimbs and hindlimbs, with grey feathers on the rest of the body. They further hypothesized that iridescence in juvenile paravians may not only indicate sexual signalling, but also intraspecific signalling for communication.

== Classification ==
In their phylogenetic analysis, Poust et al. (2020) recovered Wulong as a microraptorine member of the Dromaeosauridae, as the sister taxon to the slightly older Sinornithosaurus from the Yixian Formation.

In their 2026 description of the fellow Chinese microraptorine Jian changmaensis, Ling-Qi Zhou and colleagues included Wulong in their phylogenetic analysis, recovering it as the sister taxon to Changyuraptor. These results are displayed in the cladogram below:

- Dromaeosauridae
  - Halszkaraptorinae
  - - Unenlagiinae
    - Serraraptoria
      - Shanag ashile
      - - Microraptorinae
          - Tianyuraptor ostromi
          - - Zhenyuanlong suni
            - - IVPP V22530
                (unnamed Bayan Gobi Fm. specimen)
              - Graciliraptor lujiatunensis
              - Sinornithosaurus millenii
              - - Changyuraptor yangi
                - Wulong bohaiensis
              - - Hesperonychus elizabethae
                - Jian changmaensis
                - Microraptor zhaoianus
                - Zhongjianosaurus yangi
        - - Eudromaeosauria

== See also ==
- Dinosaur coloration
