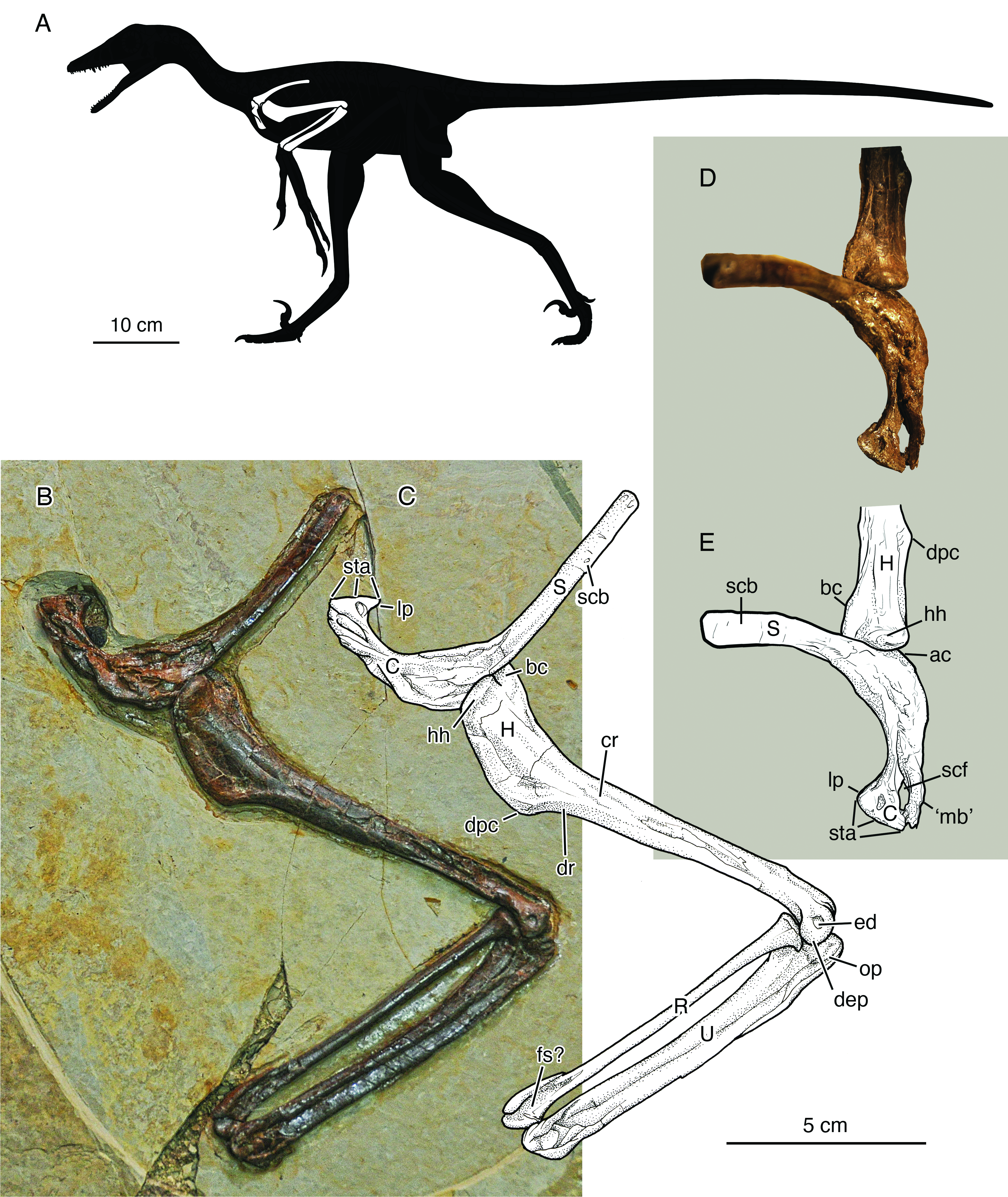
- Reconstruction of the known material on a silhouette (A) and photographs and line drawings of the holotype specimen (B–E)

Scientific classification
- Kingdom: Animalia
- Phylum: Chordata
- Class: Reptilia
- Clade: Dinosauria
- Clade: Saurischia
- Clade: Theropoda
- Family: †Dromaeosauridae
- Clade: †Microraptoria
- Genus: †Jian; Zhou et al., 2026
- Species: †J. changmaensis

Binomial name
- †Jian changmaensis Zhou et al., 2026

= Jian changmaensis =

Jian changmaensis Temporal range: Early Cretaceous, early Aptian

Species of theropod dinosaur

Jian changmaensis is an extinct species of microraptorine theropod dinosaur known from the Early Cretaceous (Aptian age) Xiagou Formation of China. J. changmaensis is the only species in the genus Jian, known from a pectoral girdle and partial forelimb. After the discovery of more than 100 bird fossils in the formation, this specimen is the first non-avian dinosaur to be described from it.

== Discovery and naming ==
J. changmaensis type locality in Changma, China

The Jian fossil material was discovered in 2008 in outcrops of the Xiagou Formation, part of the Changma Basin, near Changma village in northwest Gansu Province, China. The specimen is housed in the Gansu Geological Museum, where it is permanently accessioned as specimen GSGM-D050. It consists of an articulated portion of the skeleton, including the pectoral girdle (scapulocoracoid) and part of the forelimb (humerus, radius, and ulna). The specimen was initially reported in a 2010 conference abstract.

In 2026, Ling-Qi Zhou and colleagues described Jian changmaensis as a new genus and species of microraptorine dinosaur based on these fossil remains, establishing GSGM-D050 as the holotype specimen. The generic name, Jian, references Jiān, a one-winged bird in Chinese legend. The specific name, changmaensis, references the type locality.

== Description ==
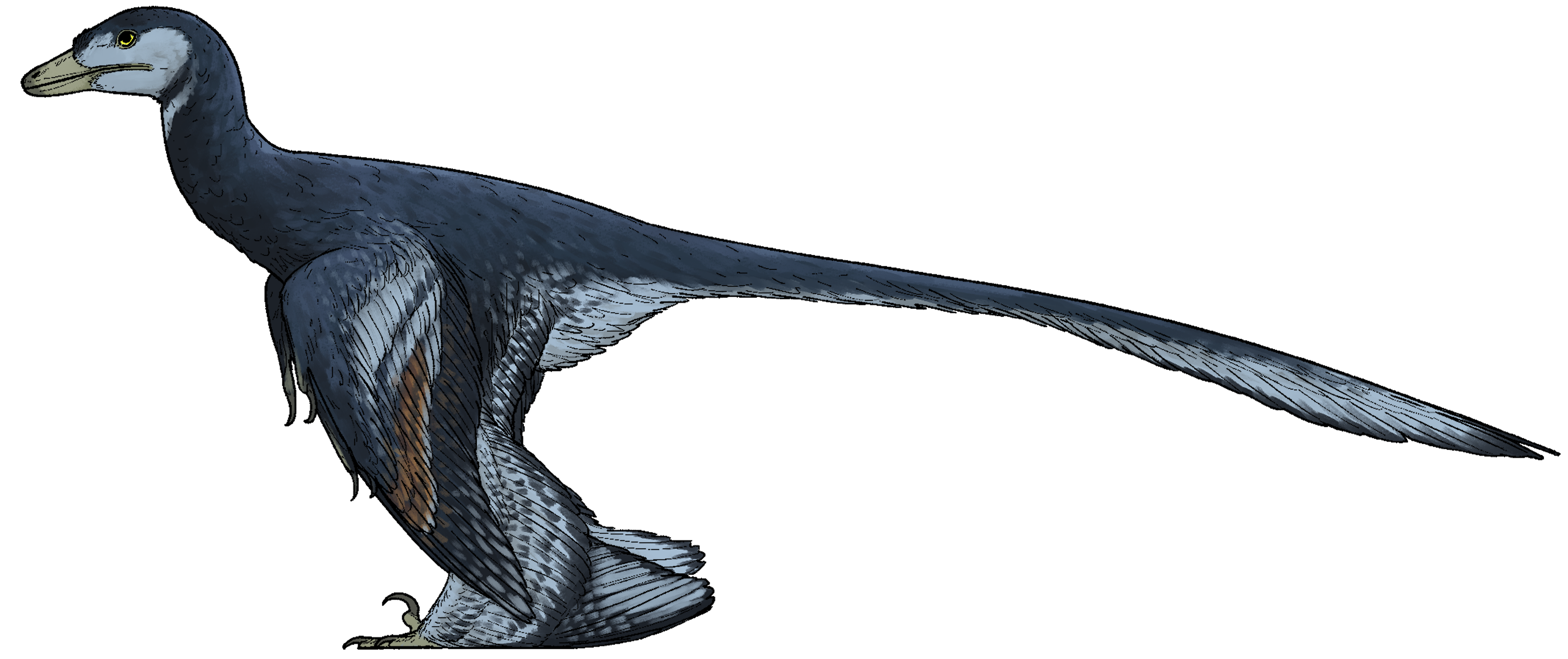
Life restoration

Jian is regarded as a medium-sized member of the Microraptorinae with a size in between that of Wulong (known from an immature specimen), Zhongjianosaurus, and small Microraptor, and the larger Sinornithosaurus and Changyuraptor. It is similar in size to large Microraptor specimens and a subadult specimen of Sinornithosaurus. Based on the firm co-ossification of the elements of the pectoral girdle (scapula and coracoid, Zhou and colleagues identified the holotype as belonging to a skeletally mature individual. The lack of grooved and pitted textures on the bone surfaces also indicates it did not have the vascular canals seen in the bone of actively growing animals.

Autapomorphies (unique derived characters distinguishing it from other species) of Jian changmaensis include the ratio of the coracoid to the humerus (greater than in any other microraptorine), the distal condyles of the humerus primarily on the bone's cranial surface (in related species it is less cranially-oriented), and the presence of a prominent foramen at the top part of the radius when seen in ventral view (from below).

== Palaeobiology ==
Several accumulations of shattered bird bones—reminiscent of the pellets regurgitated by modern owls—have been found in the Xiagou Formation site from which Jian is known. As the only non-bird from the locality, and as one of the largest known microraptorines, Jian may have been the producer of these bone masses.

== Classification ==
To test the affinities and relationships of Jian, Shou et al. (2026) included it in an updated version of the phylogenetic matrix of Pei et al. (2020). This analysis recovered Jian as a member of the dromaeosaurid subfamily Microraptorinae. Their 50% majority-rule consensus tree, which recovered better resolution than their strict consensus tree, placed it in an unresolved polytomy of derived microraptorines, including Hesperonychus, Microraptor, and Zhongjianosaurus. These results are displayed in the cladogram below:

- Dromaeosauridae
  - Halszkaraptorinae
  - - Unenlagiinae
    - Serraraptoria
      - Shanag ashile
      - - Microraptorinae
          - Tianyuraptor ostromi
          - - Zhenyuanlong suni
            - - IVPP V22530
                (unnamed Bayan Gobi Fm. specimen)
              - Graciliraptor lujiatunensis
              - Sinornithosaurus millenii
              - - Changyuraptor yangi
                - Wulong bohaiensis
              - - Hesperonychus elizabethae
                - Jian changmaensis
                - Microraptor zhaoianus
                - Zhongjianosaurus yangi
        - - Eudromaeosauria
