= Ji'an (disambiguation) =

Ji'an (吉安) is a prefecture-level city in Jiangxi, China.

Ji'an (Wade–Giles: Chi-an) may also refer to:

== Places ==
- Ji'an County (吉安县), a county in Ji'an City, Jiangxi, China
- Ji'an, Jilin (集安市), a county-level city in Tonghua, Jilin, China
- Ji-an, Hualien (吉安鄉), a township in Hualien County, Taiwan

== Other uses ==
- Tian Ji'an (c. 781–812), Tang Dynasty general
- Chinese ship Ji'an, two different ships
  - Chinese frigate Ji'an (518), type 053H frigate

== See also ==
- Jian (disambiguation)
  - Jian (given name)
- Ji'an railway station (disambiguation)
- Ji-an, Korean given name
