= Norellraptor =

Norellraptor Temporal range: Early Cretaceous, Barremian–Aptian
- Hypothetical restoration

Scientific classification
- Kingdom: Animalia
- Phylum: Chordata
- Class: Reptilia
- Clade: Dinosauria
- Clade: Saurischia
- Clade: Theropoda
- Family: †Dromaeosauridae
- Tribe: †Microraptorini
- Genus: †Norellraptor; Wang et al., 2026
- Species: †N. barsboldi

Binomial name
- †Norellraptor barsboldi Wang et al., 2026

Genus of theropod dinosaur

Norellraptor is an extinct genus of dromaeosaurid theropod dinosaur in the clade Microraptoria known from the Early Cretaceous (Barremian–Aptian ages) Jiufotang Formation of China. The genus contains a single species, Norellraptor barsboldi, known from a single complete skeleton including impressions of the plumage (specimen 130108-MHGU-F4281).

== Description and classification ==
The complete Norellraptor specimen was found assorted with a series of plummage imprints mainly on the right humerus, synsacrum and its tail. Whilst the feathers on its humerus and synsacrum could not be analysed due to bad preservation, the tail feathers were found to have a rachis-dominated morphology. The whole skeleton measured approximately 57 cm (1.87 ft) long and had a moderate disarticulation of its shoulder girdles. The specimen is believed to have been a post-juvenile upon its death. It was shown to have differing dentary crowns than those of Changyuraptor, more equal second and third metatarsal lengths than Graciliraptor, and a smaller pubic foot compared to the genera Hesperonychus and Sinornithosaurus. The third and the fourth toes had a moderately elongated penultimate phalanx and curved unguals. From these findings, Norellraptor was assigned to Microraptorini, being a sister taxon to Zhongjianosaurus.

== Etymology ==
The generic name Norellraptor is derived from the name of Mark Allen Norell, a prominent vertebrate palaeontologist known for his work on non-avian dinosaurs who passed away in 2025, and from the Latin word raptor, meaning thief. The specific epithet, barsboldi honours the late Rinchen Barsbold a prolific Mongolian palaeontologist who also passed away the same year.

== Paleoenvironment ==
Norellraptor lived in a temperate forested environment of the Jiufotang Formation, much like the older underlying Yixian Formation. It mainly lived alongside the tyrannosauroid Sinotyrannus, eutriconodont Liaoconodon, ceratopsian Psittacosaurus, and a wide assortment of enantiornithines, euornithines, and pterosaurs.
