= Fujian (disambiguation) =

Fujian is a province of the People's Republic of China.

Fujian may also refer to:

== Places ==
- Fujian Circuit, a circuit or province of the Song dynasty
- Fujian Province, Republic of China, a province of the Republic of China

== Naval ships ==
- Chinese aircraft carrier Fujian
- Fujian-class tanker

== See also ==
- Fukien (disambiguation)
- Hokkien (disambiguation)
- Fu Jian (disambiguation)
- Fuji An (disambiguation)
- Fujianese (disambiguation)
- Jianfu, a temple in Xi'an, Shaanxi, China
- Jian (disambiguation)
- Fu (disambiguation)
- Fijian (disambiguation)
- Fuegians, indigenous natives of Tierra-del-Fuego
