= Arctometatarsal =

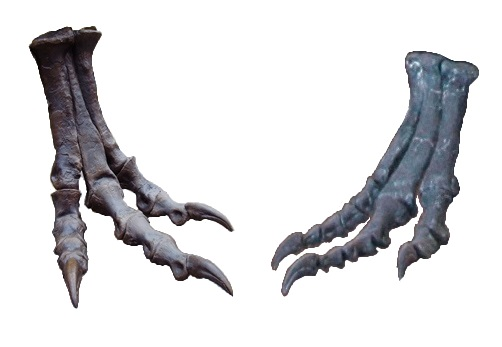
Tyrannosaurus foot showing the compressed arctometatarsalian condition of the middle metatarsal, compared to that of Allosaurus

An arctometatarsalian organism is one in which the proximal part of the middle metatarsal is pinched between the surrounding metatarsals. The trait appears to be highly homoplastic, common in certain sorts of dinosaurs accustomed to running (among them the tyrannosauroids, ornithomimosaurs, and troodontids), to evenly transmit force to the metatarsals.

A lesser degree of the condition is referred to as "subarctometatarsalian", and occurs in microraptorines, although Norellraptor and Zhongjianosaurus in particular are fully arctometatarsalian.
