= Jian (disambiguation) =

The jian (simplified Chinese: 剑; traditional Chinese: 劍; pinyin: Jiàn) is a double-edged straight sword used during the last 2,500 years in China.

Jian may also refer to:

== Weapons ==
- Jian (sword breaker) (simplified Chinese: 锏; traditional Chinese: 鐧; pinyin: Jiǎn), the Chinese sword breaker/club mace
- Chinese arrow (Chinese: 箭; pinyin: Jiàn)
- Fighter and attack aircraft of Chinese People's Liberation Army: Jiān "J" (Fighter) series

== Chinese history and culture ==
- Jian of Qi, the last king of the ancient Chinese state of Qi
- Jian (bird), a bird in Chinese mythology
- Jian (given name), Mandarin given name
- Jian (surname), Mandarin pinyin of the name 簡/简
- Jian (unit), a traditional unit of length and area in building large structures

== Others ==
- Jian (dinosaur), a genus of microraptorine dinosaurs
- Jian (era), a Japanese era from 1021 through 1024
- Jian Ghomeshi (born 1966/1967), Canadian broadcaster
- Jian (1986), a novel by Eric Van Lustbader
- Jian, Iran (disambiguation)
- Xi2 Sagittarii, a star also named Jian

== See also ==
- Ji'an (disambiguation)
- Ji-an, Korean given name
- Jian River (disambiguation)
