= Fu Jian =

Fu Jian may refer to:

- Fu Jian (317–355) (苻健, r. 351–355), founding emperor of Former Qin, posthumous name Emperor Jingming
- Fu Jian (337–385) (苻堅, r. 357–385), ruler of Former Qin, posthumous name Emperor Xuanzhao
- An alternate spelling for Fujian

== See also ==
- Fujian (disambiguation)
- Fuji An (disambiguation)
- Jianfu
- Jian (disambiguation)
- Fu (disambiguation)
