= Fuji An =

Fuji An or variant, may refer to:

- Fuji-An Gardens, Shimo-fukushima Park, Fukushima, Osaka, Osaka, Kansai, Honshu, Japan
- Fuji An, an internet celebrity working for Shopee

== See also ==
- Fujian (disambiguation)
- Fu Jian (disambiguation)
- Fuji (disambiguation)
- An (disambiguation)
