= Ji'an railway station =

Ji'an railway station may refer to the following stations:

- Ji'an railway station (Jiangxi), in Jiangxi Province, China
- Ji'an railway station (Taiwan), in Hualien County, Taiwan

== See also ==
- Ji'an (disambiguation)
