= Jian, Iran =

Jian or Jiyan (Persian: جيان) may refer to:

- Jian, Kharameh, a village
- Jian, Sepidan, a village
