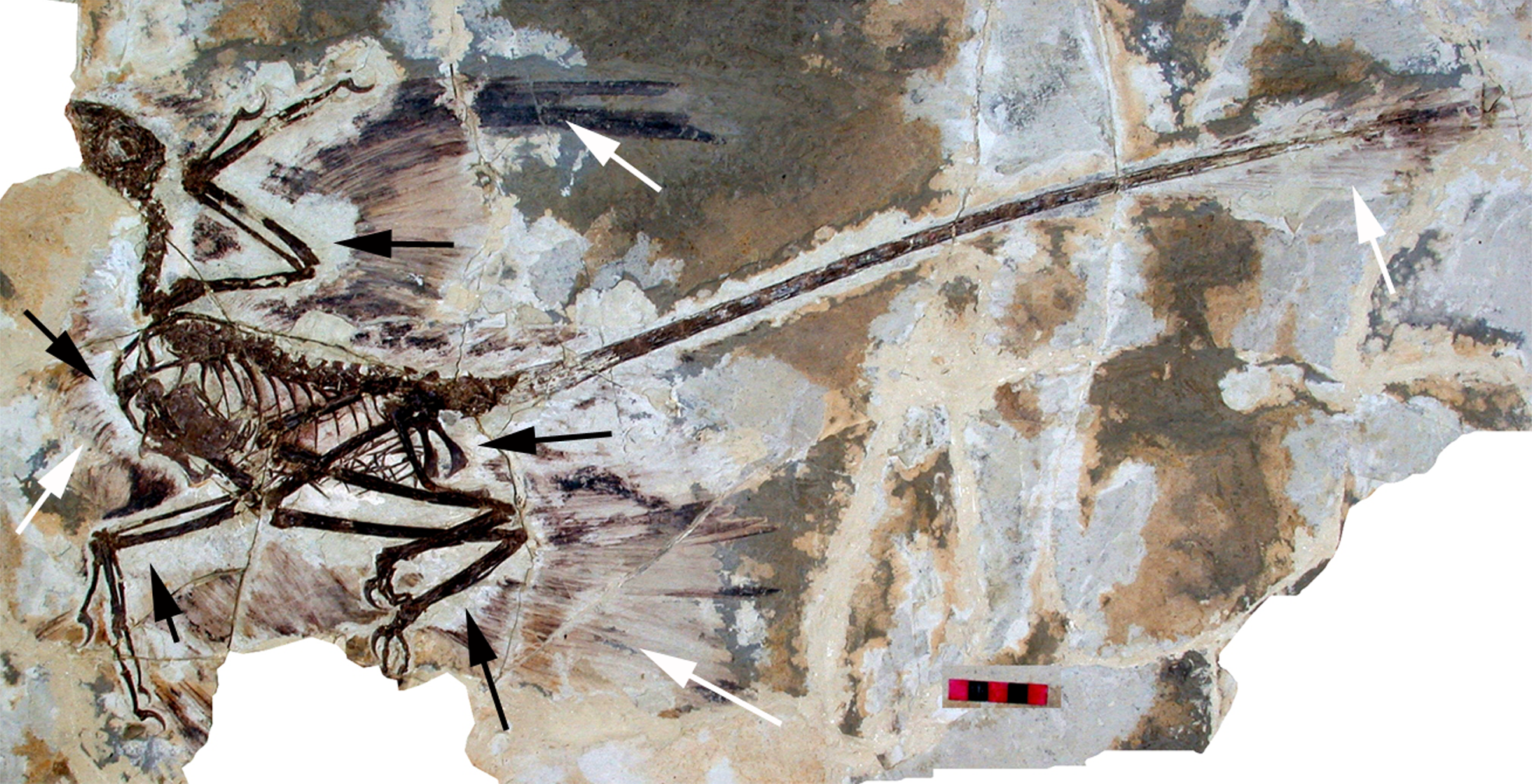
- Fossil specimen of a Microraptor, with white arrows pointing at preserved feathers

Scientific classification
- Kingdom: Animalia
- Phylum: Chordata
- Class: Reptilia
- Clade: Dinosauria
- Clade: Saurischia
- Clade: Theropoda
- Family: †Dromaeosauridae
- Clade: †Microraptoria; Senter et al., 2004

Genera
- †Changyuraptor; †Graciliraptor; †Hesperonychus?; †Jian; †Microraptor; †Norellraptor; †Shanag?; †Sinornithosaurus; †Tianyuraptor?; †Wulong; †Zhenyuanlong?; †Zhongjianosaurus

Synonyms
- Microraptorinae Senter et al., 2004

= Microraptoria =

Microraptorians Temporal range: Barremian–Aptian Possible Late Cretaceous records

Extinct clade of dinosaurs

Microraptoria (Greek, μίκρος, mīkros: "small"; Latin, raptor: "one who seizes") is a clade of basal dromaeosaurid theropod dinosaurs. Definitive microraptorians lived during the Barremian to Aptian stages of the Early Cretaceous in China. Probable microraptorian ichnotaxon Dromaeosauriformipes was discovered from the Jinju Formation of South Korea, and some fragmentary Late Cretaceous paravian fossils in North America have been described as putative members of this clade. Many are known for long feathers on their legs and may have been semiarboreal powered fliers, some of which were even capable of launching from the ground. Most microraptorians were relatively small; adult specimens of Microraptor range between 77–90 centimetres long (2.53–2.95 ft) and weigh up to 1 kg (2.2 lb), making them some of the smallest known non-avialan dinosaurs.

== Description ==
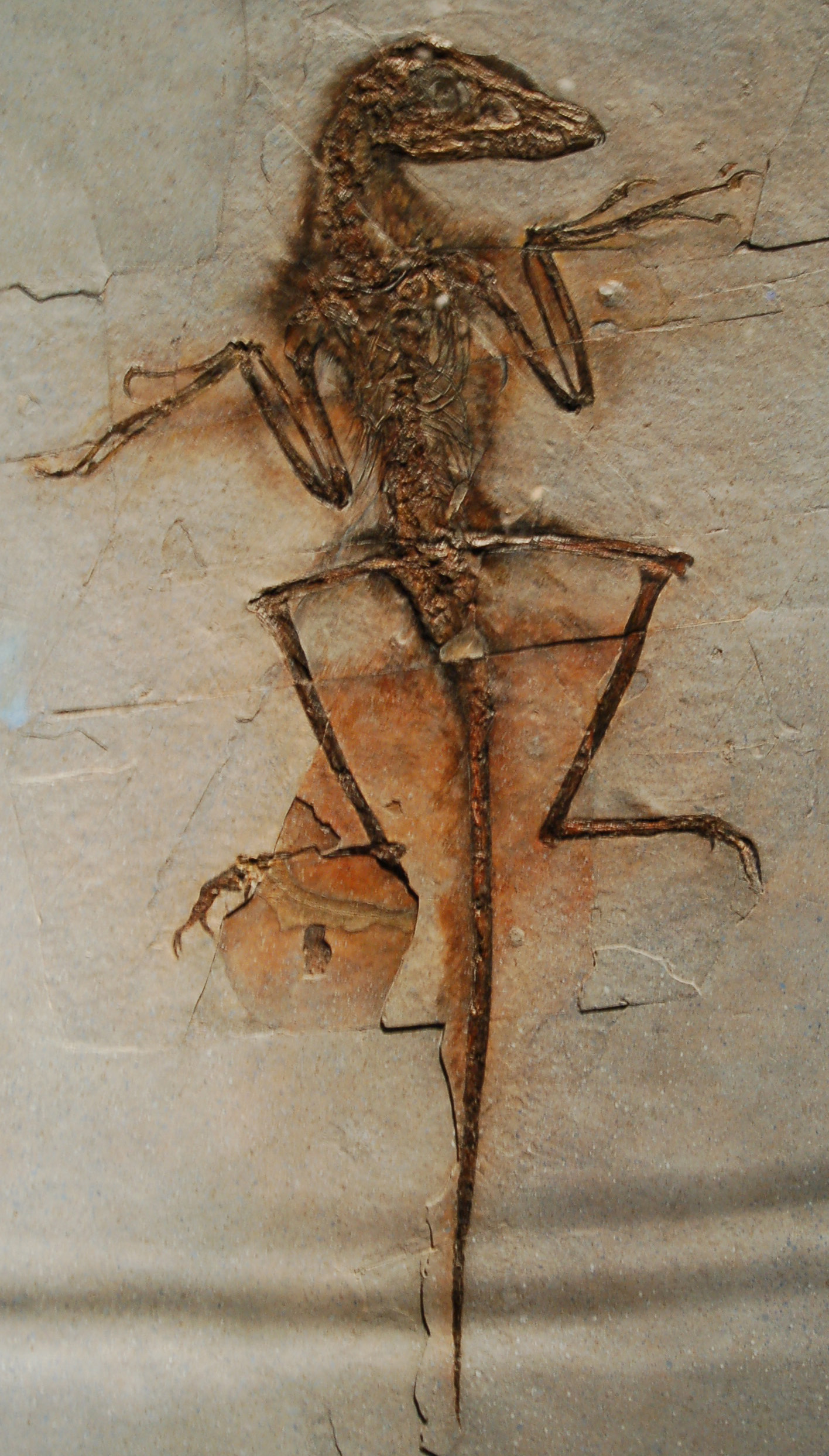
NGMC 91, believed to be a juvenile specimen of Sinornithosaurus

Microraptorians were a group of basal dromaeosaurids (popularly known as "raptors") with slender proportions and long limbs. All definitive members have been found in the Yixian and Jifuotang Formations of Liaoning County of China, so they're referred to as "Liaoning dromaeosaurids" by some researchers. These formations (collectively known as the Jehol Biota) have been dated to the early Cretaceous and at that time would have been part of a temperate wetland ecosystem threatened by frequent volcanic eruptions. Like other dromaeosaurids, microraptorians were carnivores with relatively large, serrated teeth and a hyperextendable second toe equipped with a curved claw. Some fragmentary paravian fossils from the Late Cretaceous (Campanian-Maastrichtian stages) of North America have been putatively suggested as microraptorians, though their taxonomic referral are considered controversial, namely Hesperonychus being recovered as an avialan in one phylogenetic analysis.

=== Size and proportions ===
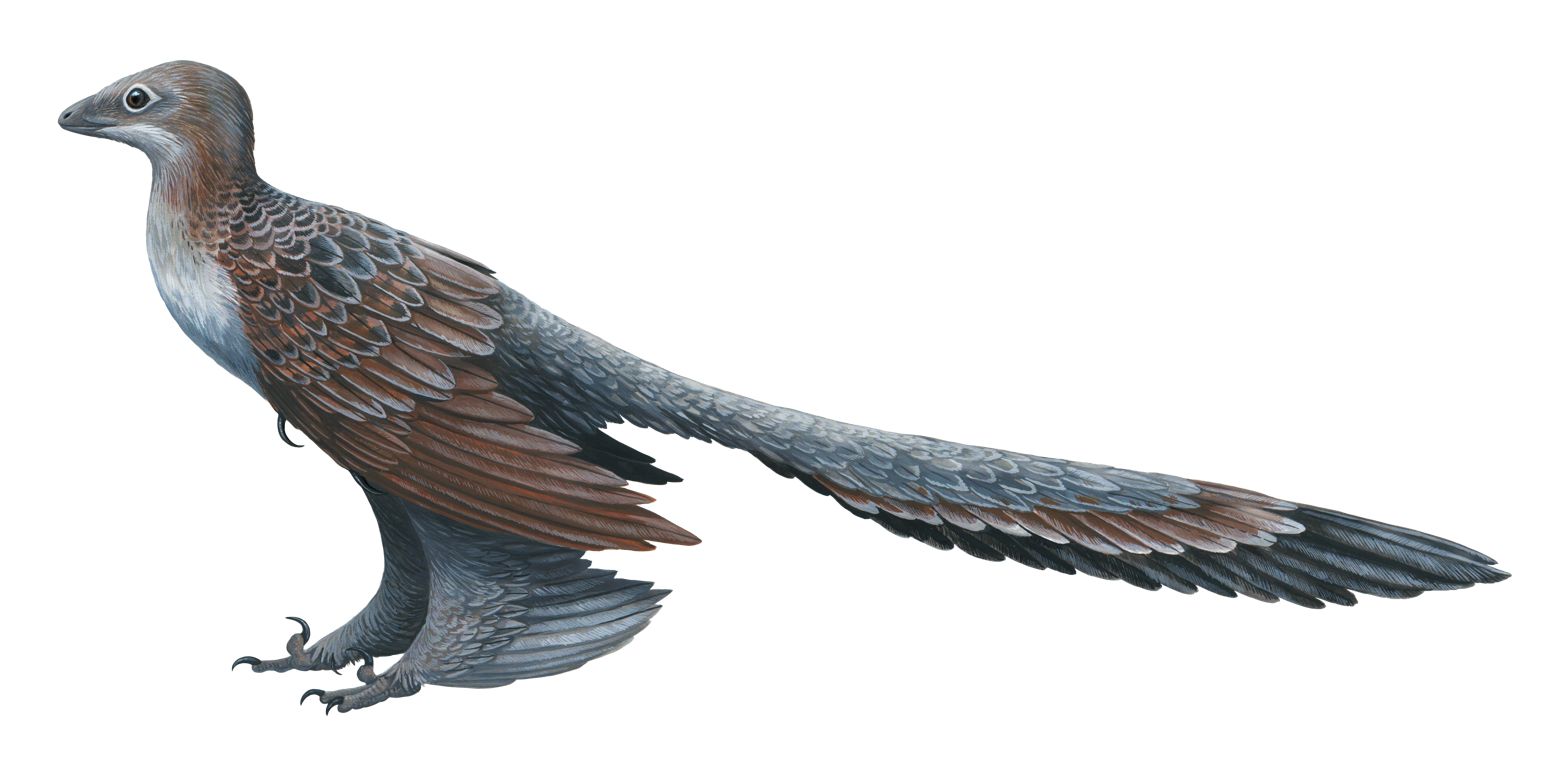
A life restoration of Changyuraptor, a large "four-winged" microraptorine

Most microraptorians were small dinosaurs, with taxa such as Microraptor and especially Zhongjianosaurus being among the smallest nonavian dinosaurs known. However, some microraptorians, such as Tianyuraptor and Changyuraptor, were larger and similar to other dromaeosaurids in size. Many microraptorians also had long and robust arms and legs, in contrast to the stockier eudromaeosaurs, although long arms are not universal to the group, since the basal microraptorian Tianyuraptor had unusually short arms by dromaeosaurid standards. Considering this, the small size and long wings of some microraptorians likely are examples of convergent evolution with other small paravians and early birds such as Anchiornis and Archaeopteryx.

=== Feathers ===
The fossilization conditions of the Jehol group are very accommodating to the preservation of soft structures in fossils, and as a result, many microraptorians have been preserved with a covering of feathers. Not only have long, advanced feathers been preserved on the arms and tails of many specimens, but a few species even have long feathers on their legs. This condition has also been seen in other paravians such as Anchiornis, and has caused these kinds of dinosaurs to be labelled as "four-winged dinosaurs". The largest known "four-winged" dinosaur, Changyuraptor, is a microraptorian. Some microraptorians such as Microraptor possibly were able to use these wings to glide or take off from the ground, and perhaps even capable of powered flight.

=== Characteristic features ===
Microraptorines can be distinguished from other dromaeosaurids by these features:

- A maxilla laterally sculpted by small pits
- A very short manual phalanx III-2
- A shortened first digit of the hand
- A splatulate (rounded) pubic symphysis
- A metatarsal III with a pinched proximal end
- A slender metatarsal II

In addition, several features are present in microraptorines except Tianyuraptor, which may be a basal member of the clade:

- A large oval fenestra in the coracoid
- Significantly shortened penultimate manual phalanges
- The posterior end of the ilium extending ventral to the ischial peduncle
- Lateral projections halfway down the pubis
- A strongly anteriorly curved pubic shaft

== Classification ==
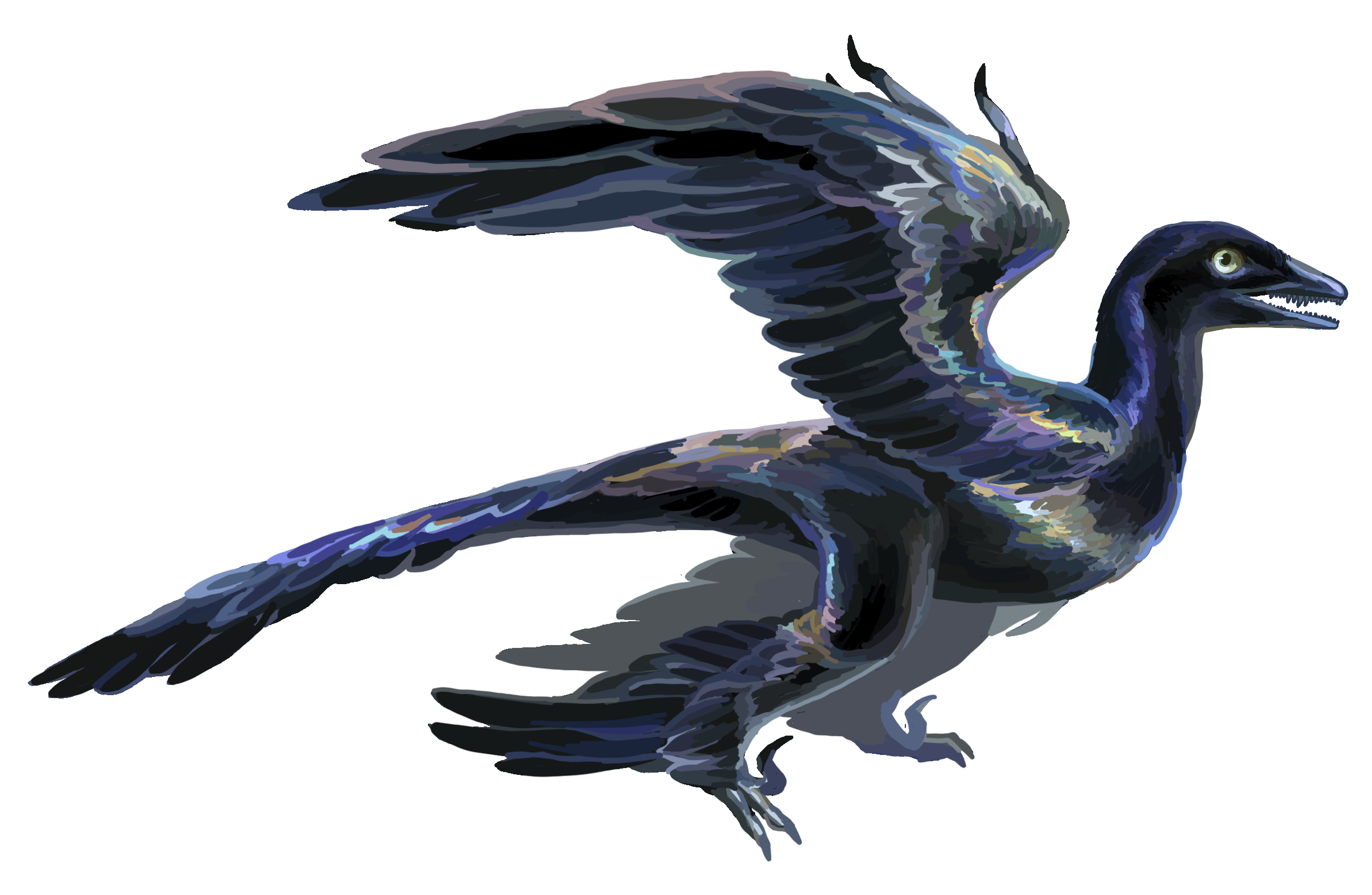
Artist's reconstruction of Microraptor

Microraptoria is usually classified as a clade of Dromaeosauridae, though some consider the group to be outside the dromaeosaurid family. Senter and colleagues expressly coined the name without the subfamily suffix -inae to avoid perceived issues with erecting a traditional family-group taxon, should the group be found to lie outside the Dromaeosauridae proper. Sereno offered a revised definition of the subgroup containing Microraptor to ensure that it would fall within the Dromaeosauridae, and erected the subfamily Microraptorinae, attributing it to Senter et al., though this usage has only appeared on his online TaxonSearch database and has not been formally published.

The cladogram below follows a 2012 analysis by paleontologists Phil Senter, James I. Kirkland, Donald D. DeBlieux, Scott Madsen and Natalie Toth.

- Dromaeosauridae
  - Xiaotingia
  - - Unenlagiinae
    - - Shanag
      - - Eudromaeosauria
          - Saurornitholestinae
          - - Velociraptorinae
            - Dromaeosaurinae
        - Microraptoria
          - Tianyuraptor
          - - Hesperonychus
            - - - Microraptor sp.
                - - Microraptor gui
                  - Microraptor zhaoianus
              - - Cryptovolans
                - Graciliraptor
                - Sinornithosaurus

In a 2024 paper that reported the smallest known juvenile specimen of Microraptor, Wang and Pei included microraptorians and eudromaeosaurians within a new clade Serraraptoria. In the phylogenetic analyses in their 2026 description of Norellraptor, Wang et al. recovered a clade of derived microraptorians/microraptorines comprising Microraptor, Norellraptor, and Zhongjianosaurus. They defined this clade, the Microraptorini, as the largest clade including Microraptor zhaoianus but not Sinornithosaurus millenii.

== See also ==
- Timeline of dromaeosaurid research
