= Fukien =

Fukien (Chinese: 福建) can refer to

- Fujian, a province of the People's Republic of China
- Fuchien Province, Republic of China, a titular province of the Republic of China (Taiwan)
- Fukien AC, an athletics club in Hong Kong

== See also ==
- Fujian (disambiguation)
- Fujianese (disambiguation)
- Hokkien (disambiguation)
