= Fujianese =

Fujianese (or Fukienese) may refer to:

- someone or something related to Fujian, China
- all of the Min Chinese dialects of Fujian

== See also ==
- Fujian (disambiguation)
- Fukien (disambiguation)
- Hokkien (disambiguation)
