= Hokkien (disambiguation) =

Hokkien is a Southern Min language spoken in Southern Fujian, Taiwan, Southeast Asia, Indonesia and elsewhere.

Hokkien may also refer to:

- Min Chinese, the main branch of Chinese languages in Fujian Province
- Fujian or Hokkien, a province of China
- Hoklo people of Hokkien, a group originating from Fujian province

== See also ==
- Fujianese (disambiguation)
- Fukien (disambiguation)
- Fujian (disambiguation)
- Hokkien mee, a noodle dish popular in Southeast Asia
