= Chinese ship Ji'an =

Two ships of the People's Liberation Army Navy have borne the name Ji'an, after the city of Ji'an, Jiangxi.

- Chinese frigate Ji'an (518), a Type 053H frigate commissioned on 31 March 1979; decommissioned in 2012.
- Chinese corvette Ji'an (586), a Type 056 corvette (designated light frigate by Chinese military) commissioned on 8 January 2014; transferred to the China Coast Guard in 2021.
