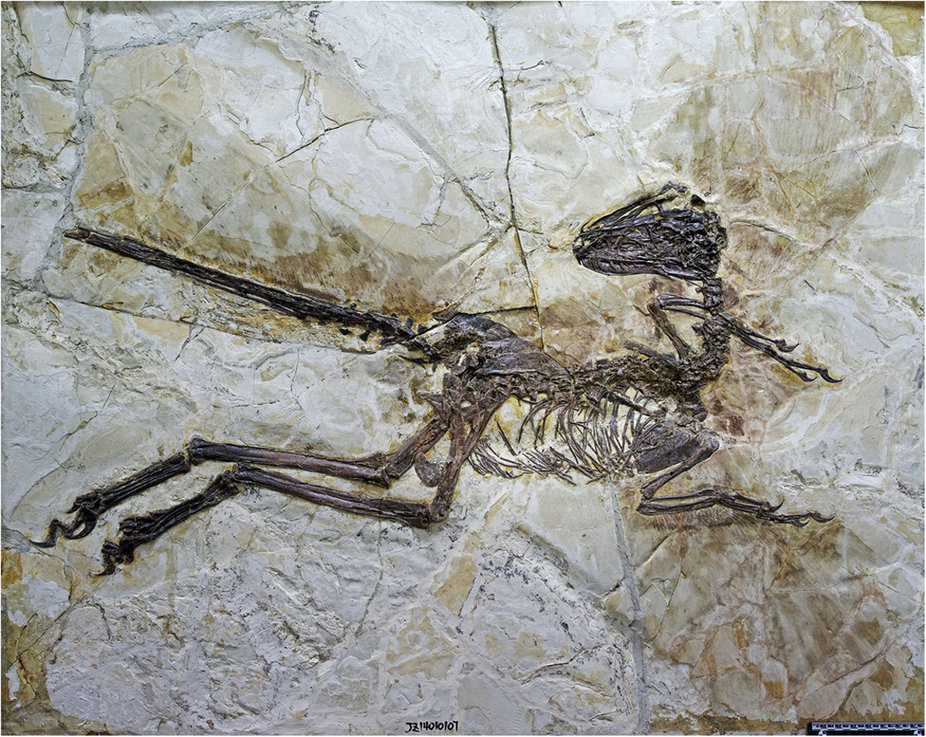
- Fossil specimen

Scientific classification
- Kingdom: Animalia
- Phylum: Chordata
- Clade: Dinosauria
- Clade: Saurischia
- Clade: Theropoda
- Family: †Dromaeosauridae
- Genus: †Zhenyuanlong; Lü & Brusatte, 2015
- Species: †Z. suni

Binomial name
- †Zhenyuanlong suni Lü & Brusatte, 2015

= Zhenyuanlong =

Zhenyuanlong Temporal range: Early Cretaceous 125 Ma

Extinct genus of dinosaurs

Zhenyuanlong (meaning "Zhenyuan's dragon", from Chinese Pinyin 龙/龍 lóng "dragon") is a genus of dromaeosaurid dinosaur from the Yixian Formation of Liaoning, China. It lived during the Aptian age of the early Cretaceous period, approximately 125 million years ago. It is known from a single specimen belonging to the species Zhenyuanlong suni (Chinese: 孫氏振元龍). This type specimen preserved a nearly complete skeleton that contains traces of feathers, including long tail feathers and large wings. In addition to further complicating diversity of Liaoning dromaeosaurids, this specimen provides the first direct evidence of well-developed pennaceous feathers in a large, non-flying dromaeosaur, raising the question of what function such wings would serve.

== Discovery ==
The specimen was found by a local farmer near Sihedang in Jianchang, Liaoning Province and was later secured for study at the Jinzhou Paleontological Museum by Zhenyuan Sun, a representative of the museum. There it was further prepared by Zhang Y.-Q. In 2015, the type species Zhenyuanlong suni was named and described by paleontologists Lü Junchang of the Chinese Academy of Geological Sciences in Beijing and Stephen Brusatte of the University of Edinburgh in the United Kingdom. The generic name combines Zhenyuan Sun's given name with the Chinese Pinyin long, meaning "dragon". The specific name refers to his family name. Zhenyuanlong was one of eighteen dinosaur taxa from 2015 to be described in open access or free-to-read journals.

The holotype, JPM-0008, was found in the Sihedang locality of Jianchang County of northeastern China's Yixian Formation, which dates from the Aptian age of the Early Cretaceous (125–113 million years ago). The holotype specimen is represented by its sub-adult status, its nearly complete and articulated skeleton lacking only half of the tail, its well preserved skull and lower jaws, and its preservation of vaned feathers on the arms and tail. The fossil is compressed on its stone plate or slab. A counterplate is absent.

== Description ==
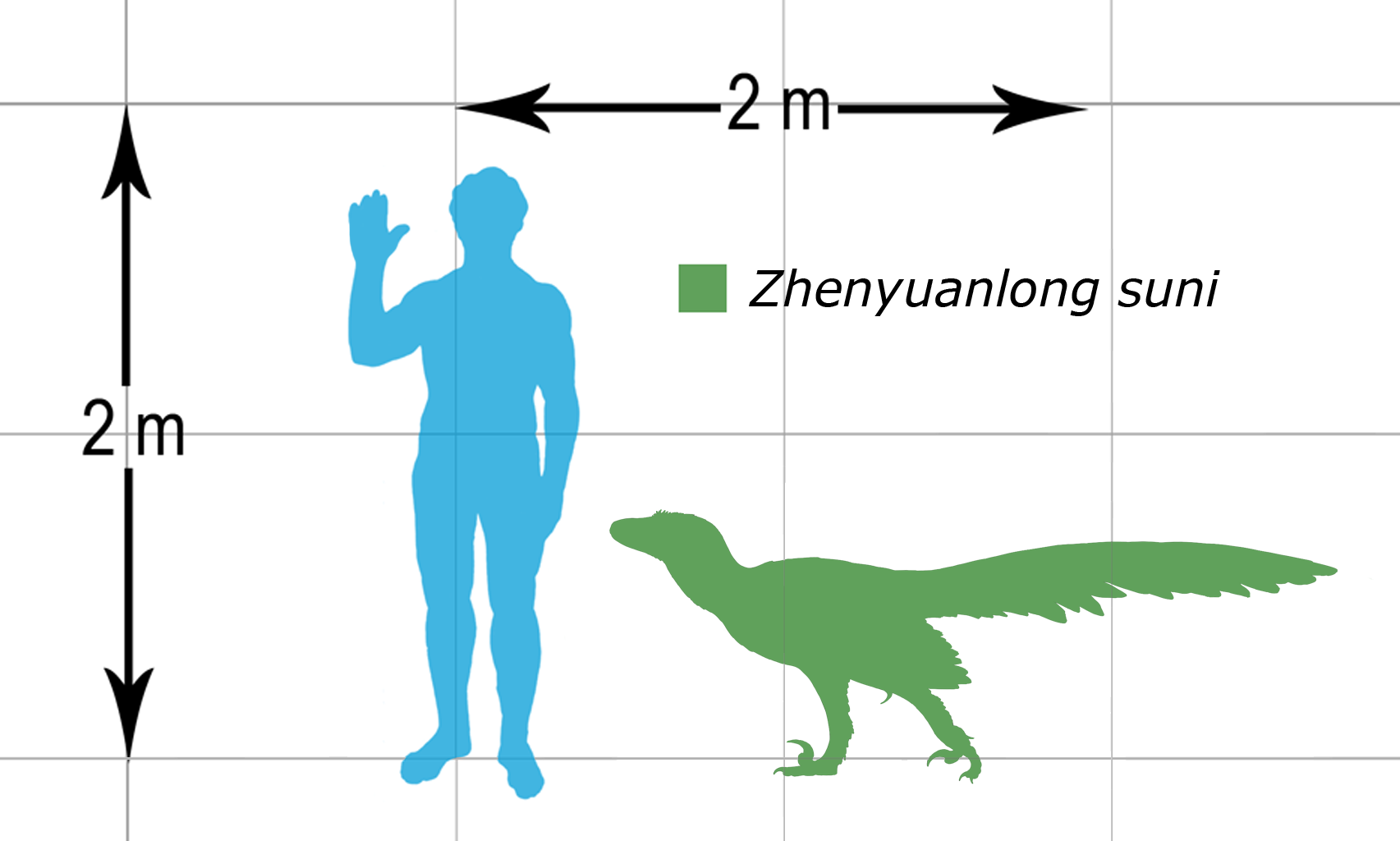
Zhenyuanlong compared in size to human

Zhenyuanlong suni was a mid-sized dromaeosaurid comparable in length to the similar Tianyuraptor. The fossil skeleton is nearly complete but lacks the last half of the tail, giving the specimen a preserved length of 122.6 centimetres (4.02 ft). Based on comparison to the complete skeleton of Tianyuraptor, it has been estimated that the skeleton of Zhenyuanlong would have been about 165 centimetres (5.41 ft) long when complete. With the added length of long tail feathers, the animal was perhaps up to 2 metres (6.6 ft) in life. The fossil represents a subadult individual, as shown by the fusion of the neural arches having been progressed into the sacrum.

Its overall proportions are comparable to Tianyuraptor, a dromaeosaurid from the same formation, and it bears many anatomical similarities to the other Liaoning dromaeosaurids. The skull is well-preserved and similar in shape to that of Tianyuraptor and the related Sinornithosaurus. Its sacrum consists of six vertebrae, four of which are clearly fused, and its tail includes the network of bony support rods typical of dromaeosaurs, as well as middle caudal (tail) vertebrae that are somewhat elongated compared to most other dromaeosaurs. Both pectoral girdles are preserved and the specimen shows non-fused sternal plates. Its leg proportions are similar to other Liaoning dromaeosaurs, with its tibiotarsus longer than the femur at a ratio of around 1.30. This large ratio is typical of Liaoning dromaeosaurs but differs from most other dinosaurs in this group.

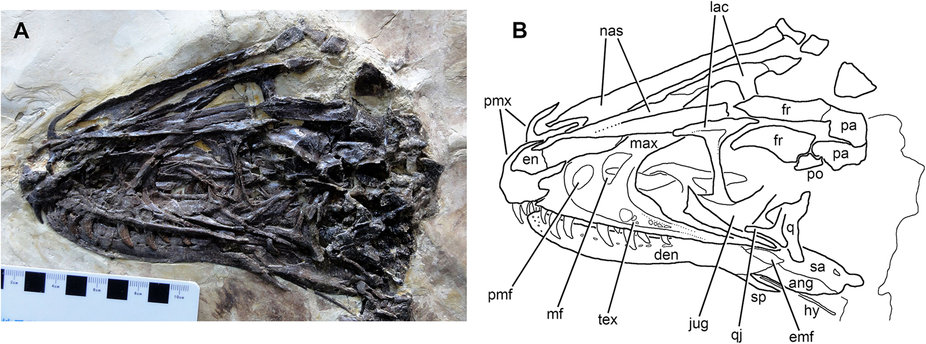
Detail of the skull

Zhenyuanlong had very short arms and the shortest arm-to-leg length ratio of any known dromaeosaurid except for the basal dromaeosaurid Mahakala and the giant unenlagiine Austroraptor. Its arms also exhibit some unique and unusual features seen in few related dinosaurs. The radius of Zhenyuanlong's forearm is among the proportionally thinnest of any theropod dinosaur, comparable only to a handful of basal coelurosaurs and to alvarezsauroids, which had extremely reduced arms and hands. Zhenyuanlong is also unique among Liaoning dromaeosaurids for its second metacarpal being shorter than the combined lengths of the first metacarpal and first bone of the innermost finger.

=== Feathers ===
The type fossil of Zhenyuanlong preserves integument on several parts of the specimen, including a "hairy" coat of simple filaments over most of the body and large, vaned feathers on the tail and arms, which would have given the animal a life appearance indistinguishable from a bird. The body feathers of Zhenyuanlong are represented by small regions of imprints in the front and back of the neck. While poorly preserved, these feathers appear to contain small, simple filaments less than a millimeter thick and up to 30 millimeters long. Whether the animal's body feathers were simple and non-shafted or more complex filaments attaching to a central vane is impossible to determine from this specimen.

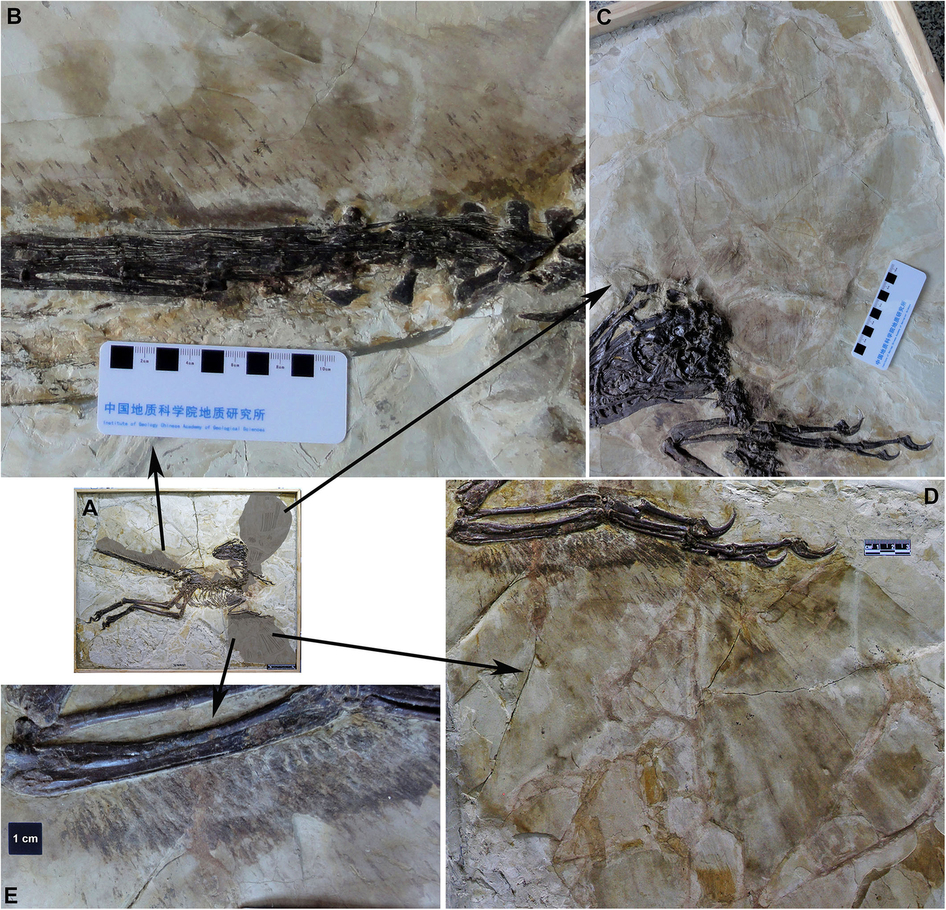
Detail of the preserved integument, showing vaned feathers on tail and wings

Despite its small arms, the feathers that made up the wings were very long, more than twice the length of the humerus (upper arm). The wings were broad, with a total surface area of about one square meter each, but their precise shape is unknown due to taphonomic distortion. The specimen's right wing shows an overlapping complex of primary feathers (which attach to the second digit of the hand), secondary feathers (which attach to the forearm), and coverts (which cover both sets). The overall feather architecture of the wings is similar to that of Microraptor, Changyuraptor, Anchiornis, Eosinopteryx, and basal avialans like Archaeopteryx, but the coverts are noteworthy for being more similar in size and shape to these feathers in modern birds. These are preserved as a row of approximately 30 feathers of a consistent small size that attach perpendicularly to the ulna and third metacarpal of the specimen. The coverts of Archaeopteryx and other basal paravians that preserve them are, by contrast, considerably longer and cover much of the wing.

The specimen's better-preserved right wing shows that the primary feathers were longer than its secondaries, and the authors estimate approximately 10 primaries and 20 secondaries. An asymmetric shape, as in modern birds, may be visible on some of both primaries and secondaries, but preservational distortion makes it difficult to assess this for certain. Overall, the shape and feather architecture of Zhenyuanlong's wings were most similar to those of Microraptor, though the former lacks any sign of the alula feathers which attach to the first finger in modern birds and possibly Microraptor.

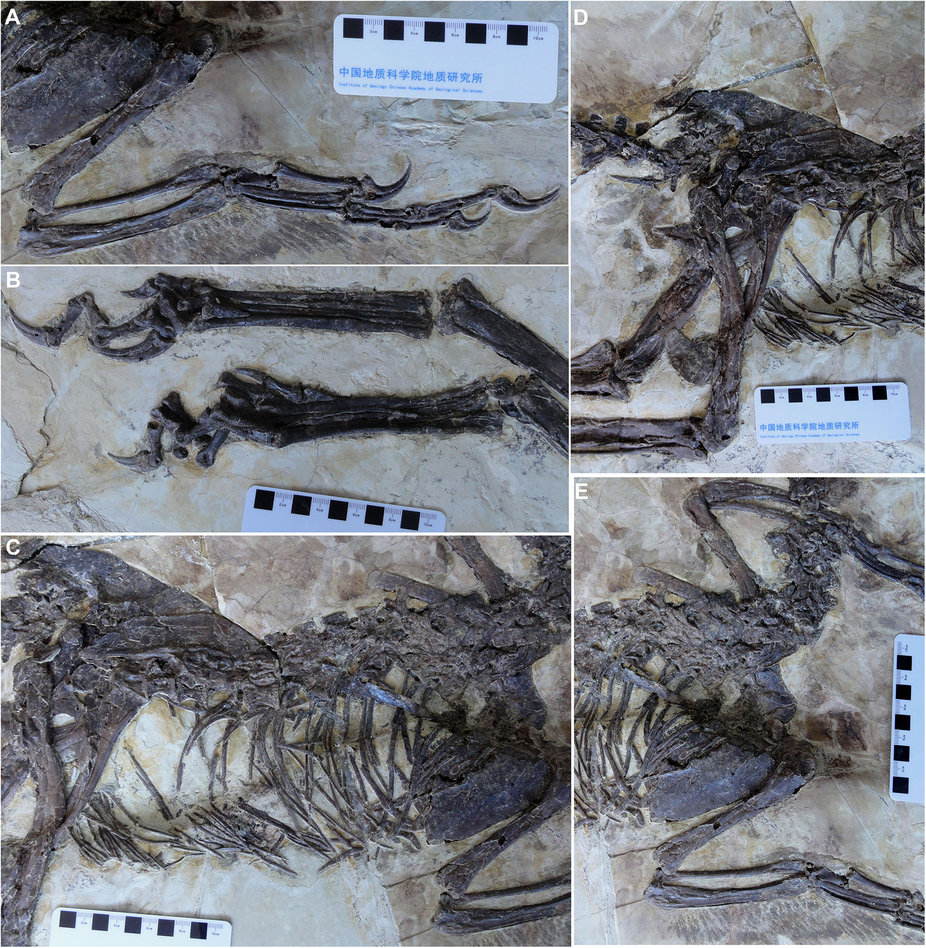
Detail of the skeleton

Long vaned feathers were also present along the length of the tail, and are preserved as a series of long projections of vanes at a 45-degree angle from the tail vertebrae. While preservation makes symmetry difficult to assess, these feathers appear generally similar to the tail feathers of other birdlike dinosaurs that preserve this region, including Sinornithosaurus, Jinfengopteryx, Anchiornis, Eosinopteryx, and Archaeopteryx. This differentiates the tail of Zhenyuanlong from Microraptor and the related Changyuraptor, which had shorter feathers along the base and middle of the tail but large, complex fans at the tip. However, since the end of Zhenyuanlong's tail is not preserved, it's impossible to rule out the presence of a fan entirely.

Given the close affinity of Zhenyuanlong with Microraptor, Changyuraptor and Sinornithosaurus, it is noteworthy that the specimen does not preserve any feathers on the hind limbs. Some of its closest relatives are known for long, voluminous vaned feathers attaching to the ankles and lower legs, and Zhenyuanlong's lack of similar feathers may indicate another unique anatomical feature of this animal among its relatives. However, the specimen's hind limbs belong to a piece of slab that preserves no other feathers on the body, while the other pieces all preserve feathers. Therefore, the lack of leg-feathers on Zhenyuanlong may be an artifact of preservation or preparation and, like the presence of a tail fan, cannot be ruled out with certainty.

== Paleobiology ==
At around 2 metres in length and covered in complex feathers, Zhenyuanlong would have been virtually indistinguishable from a large bird in life, and has been compared to a turkey, emu, or "big chicken", with wings similar to those of an eagle or vulture. Its size would have been just over that of a modern condor, but it would have been at least twice as heavy at an estimated 20 kilograms (44 lb). Despite the modern-looking wings, due to this size and weight the animal was unlikely to be able to "fly or glide or do anything in the air".

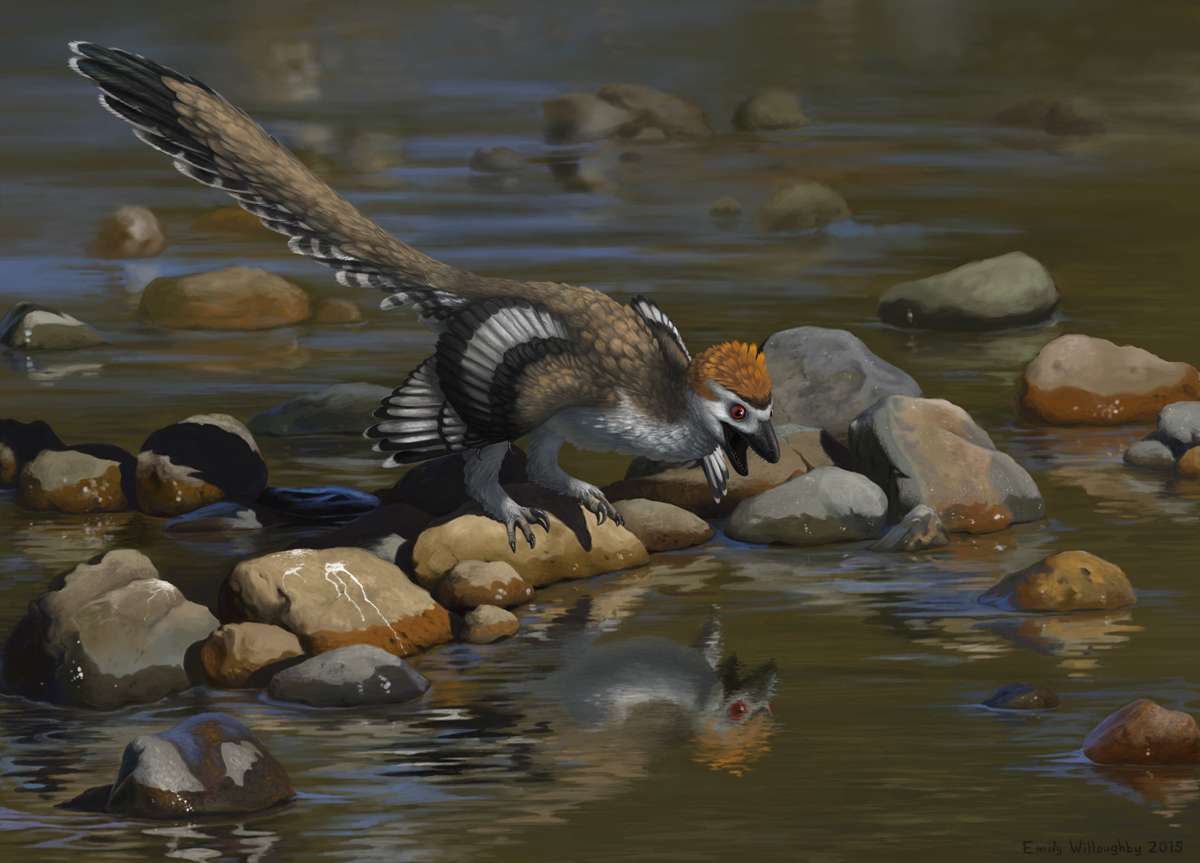
Life restoration of Zhenyuanlong depicted using its wings in a threat display, as suggested by the authors

Zhenyuanlong is considered by its authors to be a "rare and aberrant animal" compared to the related group of Liaoning dromaeosaurids to which it belongs, due to its large body size and short arms. It is the first demonstration of feather morphology in a short-armed dromaeosaurid, and is currently the largest known non-avian dinosaur with complex wings. Though the authors state that the animal is likely too big to fly, they also stress the importance of biomechanical modeling before drawing specific conclusions about the aerodynamic function (or lack thereof) of Zhenyuanlong's wings.

This raises the question of what such a large, short-armed animal was doing with complex wings and feathers so similar to those used for flight in other animals. One possibility is that Zhenyuanlong is secondarily flightless, having a shared ancestry with smaller, potentially volant dromaeosaurids like Microraptor and then retaining aspects of flight capability through inertia or unknown adaptive reasons. Other possibilities include the use of wings in displaying to mates or rivals, protecting eggs in its nest, or even some amount of arboreal gliding. So-called "wing-assisted incline running", which some modern birds use to help "flap" up steep inclines, is one potential aerodynamic use of Zhenyuanlong's wings. According to the authors and other paleontologists, the most viable hypothesis at this time is the use of the wings in sexual display, either to threaten rivals or to court potential mates, much as a peacock uses its tail to impress hens.

Regardless of what practical function Zhenyuanlong's wings may have served, its discovery has provided a new glimpse into the diversity of Liaoning dromaeosaurid body plans and to the diversity of the Jehol Biota more generally. Despite the fact that the six Liaoning dromaeosaurids are spread across two formations (Yixian and Jiufotang) and therefore might not have all been contemporaneous, it is still the case that large-bodied, short-armed dromaeosaurids like Zhenyuanlong must have been coexisting with some of the smaller, long-armed ones, much as ecosystems support multiple species of birds today.

== Classification ==
Zhenyuanlong has been placed in the family Dromaeosauridae. The authors' cladistic analysis recovered it in the same position in the evolutionary tree as the other five Liaoning dromaeosaurids (Changyuraptor, Graciliraptor, Microraptor, Sinornithosaurus, and Tianyuraptor) and the Eudromaeosauria though their exact relationships could not be resolved. The cladogram below follows the analysis of the holotype by Lü & Brusatte 2015.

- Dromaeosauridae
  - Mahakala
  - - Unenlagia
    - Austroraptor
    - Buitreraptor
    - Rahonavis
    - - Graciliraptor
      - Changyuraptor
      - Microraptor
      - Sinornithosaurus
      - Tianyuraptor
      - Zhenyuanlong
      - - Eudromaeosauria
          - Bambiraptor
          - Saurornitholestes
          - Tsaagan
          - Adasaurus
          - Deinonychus
          - - Balaur
            - Velociraptor
            - Dromaeosaurinae
              - Achillobator
              - Utahraptor
              - Atrociraptor
              - Dromaeosaurus

It was noted that Zhenyuanlong did not necessarily form its own group or clade with Tianyuraptor, despite uniquely sharing short arms among the Liaoning dromaeosaurids, and nor did the Liaoning dromaeosaurids form their own clade. Instead, they resolved into a broad group that included eudromaeosaurs, which in turn includes the Laurasian Dromaeosaurinae and Velociraptorinae subfamilies. This condition, where a node (which represents a shared ancestor) begets multiple immediate branches that don't cluster into further groups, is known as a polytomy and reflects phylogenetic uncertainty. The uncertainty in the case of Zhenyuanlong is a result of homoplasy induced by introduction of the new genus. This means that Zhenyuanlong possesses a "hodge-podge" of characters shared with a number of disparate dromaeosaurids. For example, Zhenyuanlong shares its short arm morphology with Tianyuraptor, but other features with dromaeosaurids that are not closely related to Tianyuraptor.

The result is that it is not yet possible to know precisely where Zhenyuanlong's closest phylogenetic affinities lie. There may exist a clade of Liaoning dromaeosaurids that includes a smaller group of short-armed dromaeosaurids, or short arms may have evolved multiple times in this group.

== See also ==
- Timeline of dromaeosaurid research
