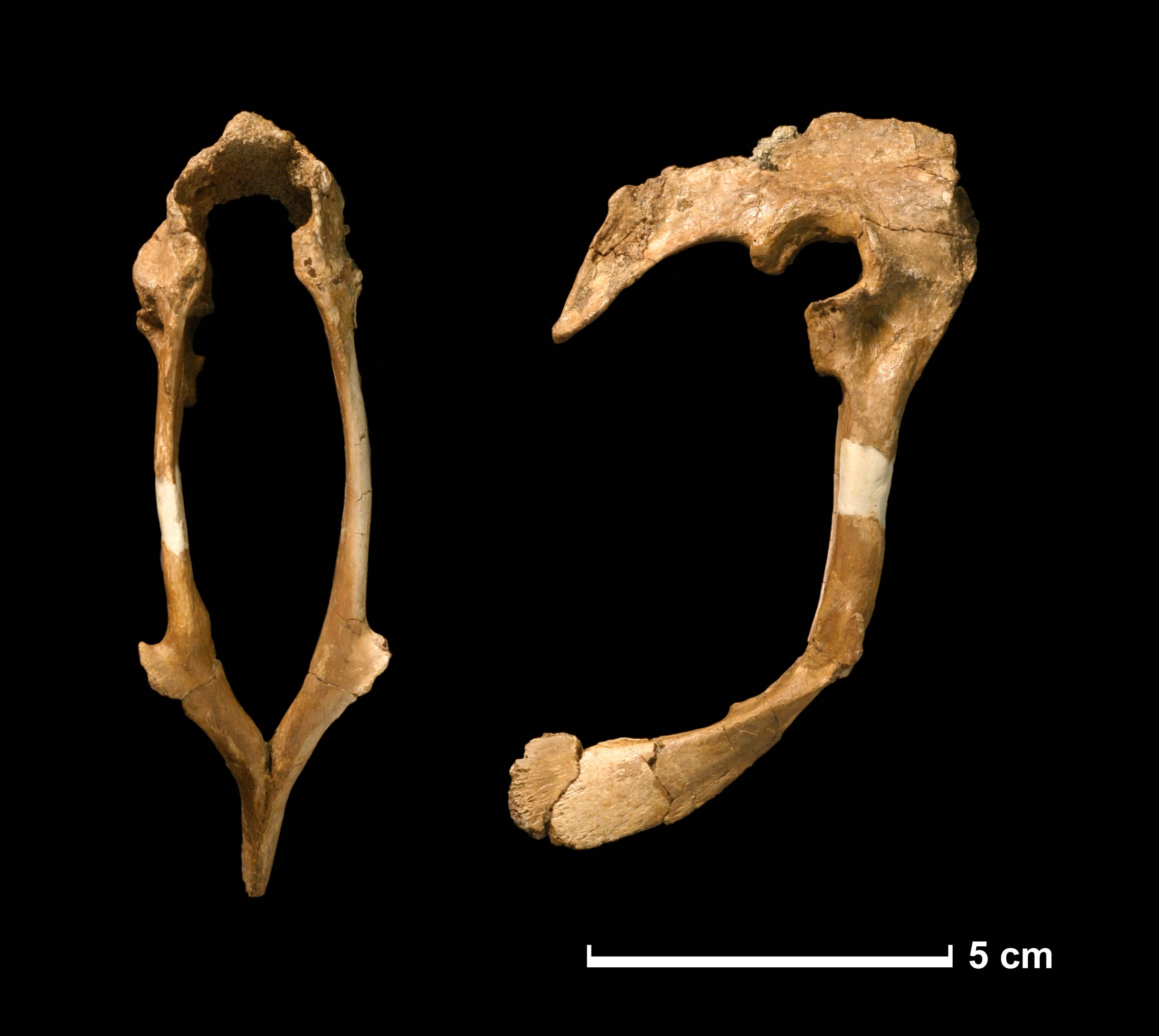
- UALVP 48778, holotype pelvis

Scientific classification
- Kingdom: Animalia
- Phylum: Chordata
- Class: Reptilia
- Clade: Dinosauria
- Clade: Saurischia
- Clade: Theropoda
- Clade: Paraves
- Family: †Dromaeosauridae
- Genus: †Hesperonychus; Longrich & Currie, 2009
- Species: †H. elizabethae

Binomial name
- †Hesperonychus elizabethae Longrich & Currie, 2009

= Hesperonychus =

Hesperonychus Temporal range: Late Cretaceous, 76.5–75 Ma

Extinct genus of dinosaurs

Hesperonychus (meaning "western claw") is a genus of small dromaeosaurid dinosaur. There is one described species, Hesperonychus elizabethae. The type species was named in honor of Dr. Elizabeth Nicholls of the Royal Tyrrell Museum of Palaeontology who collected it as a student in 1982. It is known from fossils recovered from the Dinosaur Park Formation and possibly from the uppermost strata of the Oldman Formation of Alberta, dating to the Campanian stage of the Late Cretaceous around 75 million years ago.

== Description ==
Hesperonychus is mainly known from one partial pelvic girdle, holotype specimen UALVP 48778, collected by Dr. Elizabeth Nicholls in Dinosaur Provincial Park in 1982. The fossil remained undescribed, however, until Nick Longrich and Phil Currie published on it in 2009. A number of very small toe bones discovered from the Dinosaur Park Formation and Oldman Formation, including "sickle claws", in the collection of the Royal Tyrrell Museum have been tentatively referred to as cf. Hesperonychus.

The gracile appearances of these potential toe bones make it unlikely that Hesperonychus belonged to the Eudromaeosauria. Despite their small size, the pubic bones were fused, a characteristic of adult dinosaurs, indicating that the specimen does not represent a juvenile of a known species. Though known from partial remains, researchers have estimated that it was a small dinosaur measuring about 1 metre (3.3 ft) long and weighing between 1.5 and 2 kilograms (3.3 and 4.4 lb), making it one of the smallest non-avian dinosaurs known from North America.

== Classification ==
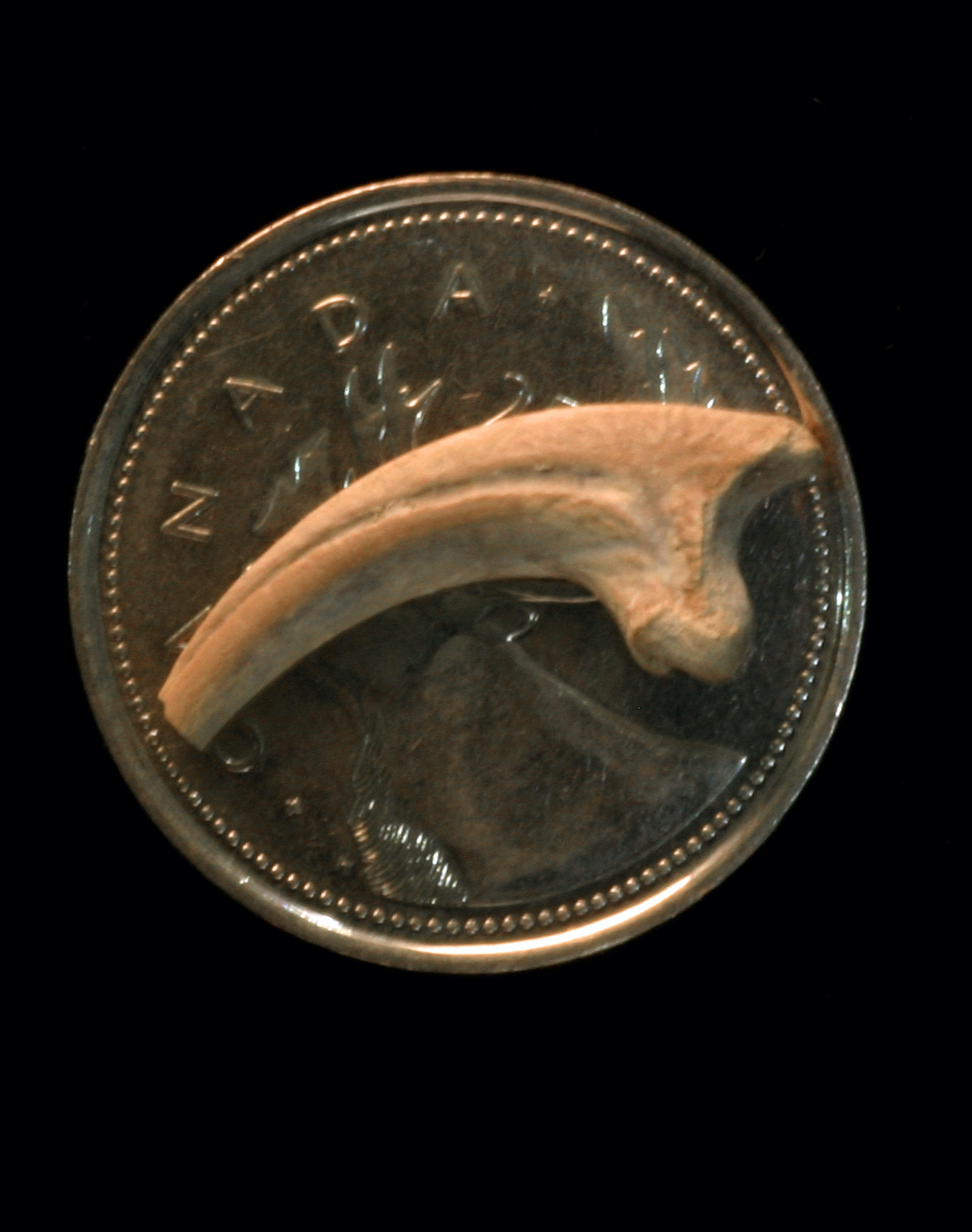
Sickle claw (pedal phalanx II-2) from the second toe of cf. Hesperonychus, with a quarter for scale.

A phylogenetic analysis performed by Longrich and Currie found Hesperonychus to be a member of the Microraptorinae, a clade of small dromaeosaurids previously thought to be restricted to the Early Cretaceous of Asia. The authors described this find as "remarkable"; the previously youngest known microraptorine was Microraptor itself from the Aptian stage of the Early Cretaceous, so the discovery of Hesperonychus in the Late Cretaceous Campanian stage pushed the fossil range of microraptorines forward by 45 million years. While the Late Cretaceous, North American Bambiraptor had sometimes been classified as a microraptorine, other researchers (including Longrich and Currie) have found that it is more closely related to Saurornitholestes.

Hesperonychus was assigned to Microraptoria due to having a spatulate (rounded) pubic symphysis, a strong posterior curvature of the distal shaft of the pubis, and lateral tubercules on the pubes, which are expanded into 'wing-like' structures in the case of Hesperonychus.

Cladogram (2012):

- Dromaeosauridae
  - Xiaotingia
  - - Unenlagiinae
    - - Shanag
      - - Eudromaeosauria
          - Saurornitholestinae
          - - Velociraptorinae
            - Dromaeosaurinae
        - Microraptoria
          - Tianyuraptor
          - - Hesperonychus
            - - - Microraptor sp.
                - - Microraptor gui
                  - Microraptor zhaoianus
              - - Cryptovolans
                - Graciliraptor
                - Sinornithosaurus

However, subsequent studies have questioned its identity as a microraptorine, with some researchers excluding the taxon from phylogenetic analyses due to its fragmentary remains and others classifying it in various positions within or outside dromaeosaurids. In 2012, Martyniuk considered Hesperonychus as a eudromaeosaurian. In 2013, microraptorines were considered as averaptorans outside dromaeosaurids. In 2014, Brusatte and colleagues pruned five "wildcard" taxa including the paravians Pyroraptor and Hesperonychus from phylogenetic analyses, mainly due to a huge lack of data, indicating that the definitive classifications of these taxa are uncertain. Other studies have also followed this exclusion of Hesperonychus.

In 2019, Hartman and colleagues suggested that Hesperonychus is actually an avialan close to modern birds like Balaur bondoc based on phylogenetic analyses, though they disagreed with microraptorines being avialans. In the same year, Rauhut and colleagues considered various genera of theropods including Hesperonychus as 'problematic taxa' due to their unstable phylogenetic position. In 2020, Hesperonychus was recovered as a dromaeosaurid and a sister taxon, but not a member, of the polytomic microraptorines.

== Paleobiology ==
Microraptorines are well known for their small size and, in some cases, ability to fly or glide. Longrich and Currie concluded that it was unlikely for Hesperonychus to exhibit four wings or gliding behavior as in Microraptor, and speculated that it was more likely to be similar to Sinornithosaurus given their closer similarity in size. Nevertheless, Hesperonychus seems to show that microraptorines did not vary much in size, remaining very small relative to other dromaeosaurids throughout their history, though it is questionable whether it was indeed a microraptorine or a dromaeosaurid.

Whether it was a microraptorine or not, the discovery of Hesperonychus filled in a gap in the ecology of Late Cretaceous North America. Unlike roughly contemporary environments in Europe and Asia, North America appeared to lack very small carnivorous dinosaurs. In modern ecosystems dominated by endothermic mammals, small animal species outnumber larger ones. Since dinosaurs are also presumed to have been endotherms, the lack of small species and great number of known large species in North America was unusual. Hesperonychus helped to fill that gap, especially since, given the number of fragmentary remains and claws that have been collected (representing at least ten distinct specimens, compared to thirty of the contemporary Saurornitholestes and two of Dromaeosaurus), it appears to have been a very common feature of the Dinosaur Park Formation environment.

§The next smallest carnivore in the environment was the mammal Eodelphis, which weighed only 600 grams. There does not appear to have been any overlap between the smallest dinosaurs and the largest mammals in ecosystems such as this, which Longrich and Currie explained by hypothesizing that either competition from dinosaurs kept mammals from growing larger (the traditional view), competition from mammals kept the dinosaurs from growing smaller, or both.

== See also ==
- Timeline of dromaeosaurid research
- 2009 in paleontology
