= Fijian =

Fijian may refer to:

- Something of, from, or related to the country of Fiji
- The Fijians, persons from Fiji, or of Fijian descent. For more information about the Fijian people, see:
  - Demographics of Fiji
  - Culture of Fiji
- Fijian language
- Fijian cuisine

== See also ==
- List of Fijians
