= Jian, Kharameh =

Jian جيان
- Village
- Location within Iran
- Coordinates: 29°38′02″N 53°08′12″E
- Country: Iran
- Province: Fars
- County: Kharameh
- Bakhsh: Central
- Rural District: Dehqanan

Population (2006)
  - Total: 297
- Time zone: UTC+3:30 (IRST)
  - Summer (DST): UTC+4:30 (IRDT)

Jian (Persian: جيان, also Romanized as Jīān) is a village in Dehqanan Rural District, in the Central District of Kharameh County, Fars province, Iran. At the 2006 census, its population was 297, in 75 families.
