= Jian River =

Jian River may refer to:

- Jian River (Guangdong) (鉴江)
- Jian River (Sichuan) (湔江)
