= Ji-an =

- Hangul: 지안
- RR: Jian
- MR: Chian

Ji-an (Korean: 지안) is a Korean given name. Notable people with the name include:

- Han Ji-an, South Korean actress
- Kim Ji-an, South Korean actress
- Won Ji-an, South Korean actress
