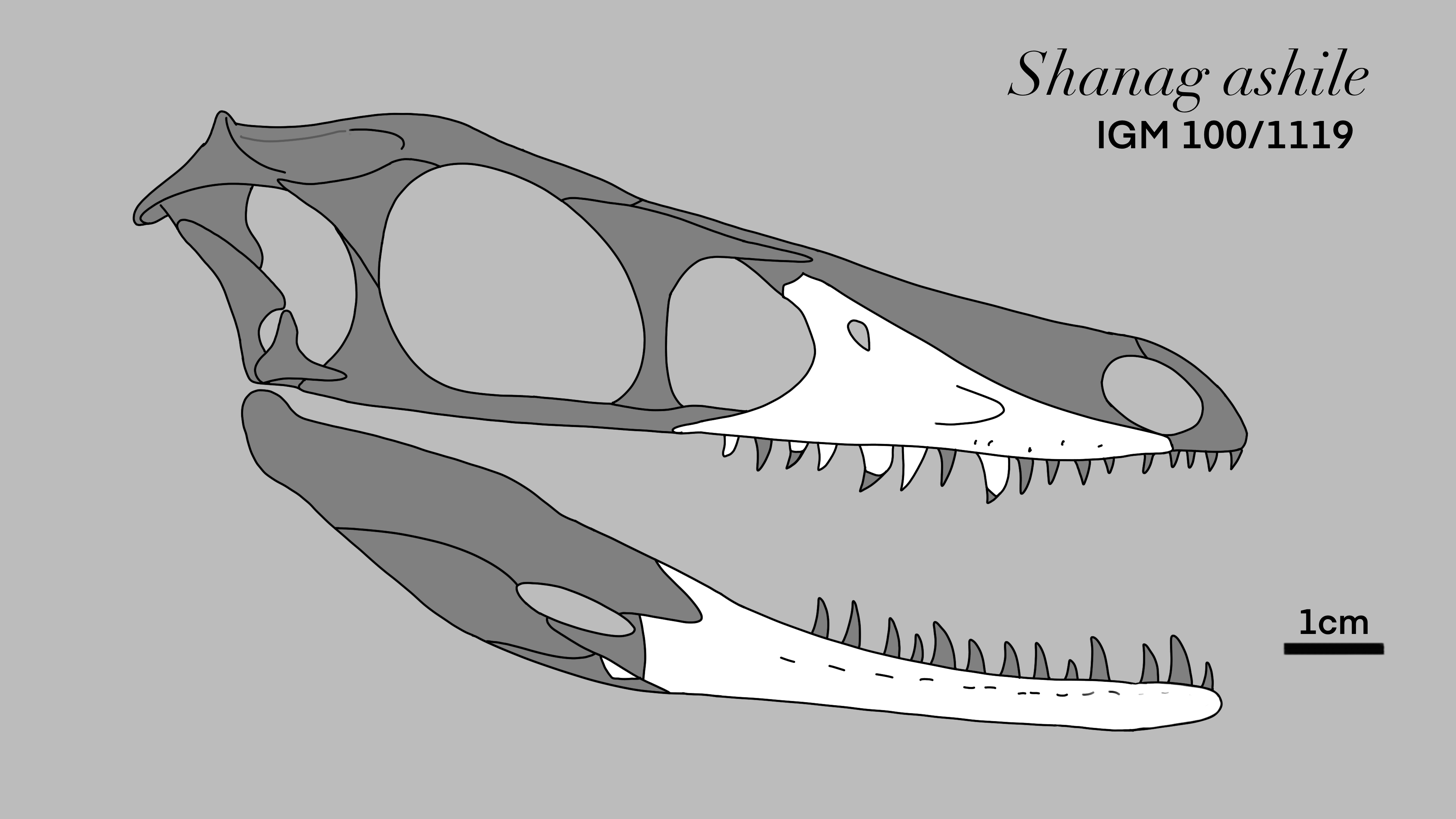
- Reconstructed skull

Scientific classification
- Kingdom: Animalia
- Phylum: Chordata
- Class: Reptilia
- Clade: Dinosauria
- Clade: Saurischia
- Clade: Theropoda
- Clade: Paraves
- Family: †Dromaeosauridae
- Genus: †Shanag; Turner et al., 2007
- Species: †S. ashile

Binomial name
- †Shanag ashile Turner et al., 2007

= Shanag =

Shanag Temporal range: Early Cretaceous, 130 Ma

Extinct genus of dinosaurs

Shanag is a genus of paravian theropod dinosaur from the Early Cretaceous Period of Mongolia. It may be a dromaeosaurid, but some researchers are skeptical of this classification. The type species is S. ashile.

== Discovery and naming ==
Shanag was named and described by Alan Turner, Sunny Hai-Ching Hwang and Mark Norell in 2007. The generic name refers to the black-hatted dancers in the Buddhist Cham dance. The specific name refers to the Ashile Formation, the old name for the layers where Shanag was found, used by Henry Fairfield Osborn.

The holotype of Shanag, IGM 100/1119, was discovered in the Öösh Formation, the stratification of which is uncertain but probably dating to the Berriasian-Barremian. Shanag bears a strong resemblance to basal Chinese dromaeosaurids such as Microraptor and Sinornithosaurus, suggesting a close similarity between the fauna of the Öösh deposits, dated tentatively to 130 million years ago, and the Jehol Biota of China (such as the animals found in the roughly contemporary Yixian Formation), during the Early Cretaceous.

== Description ==
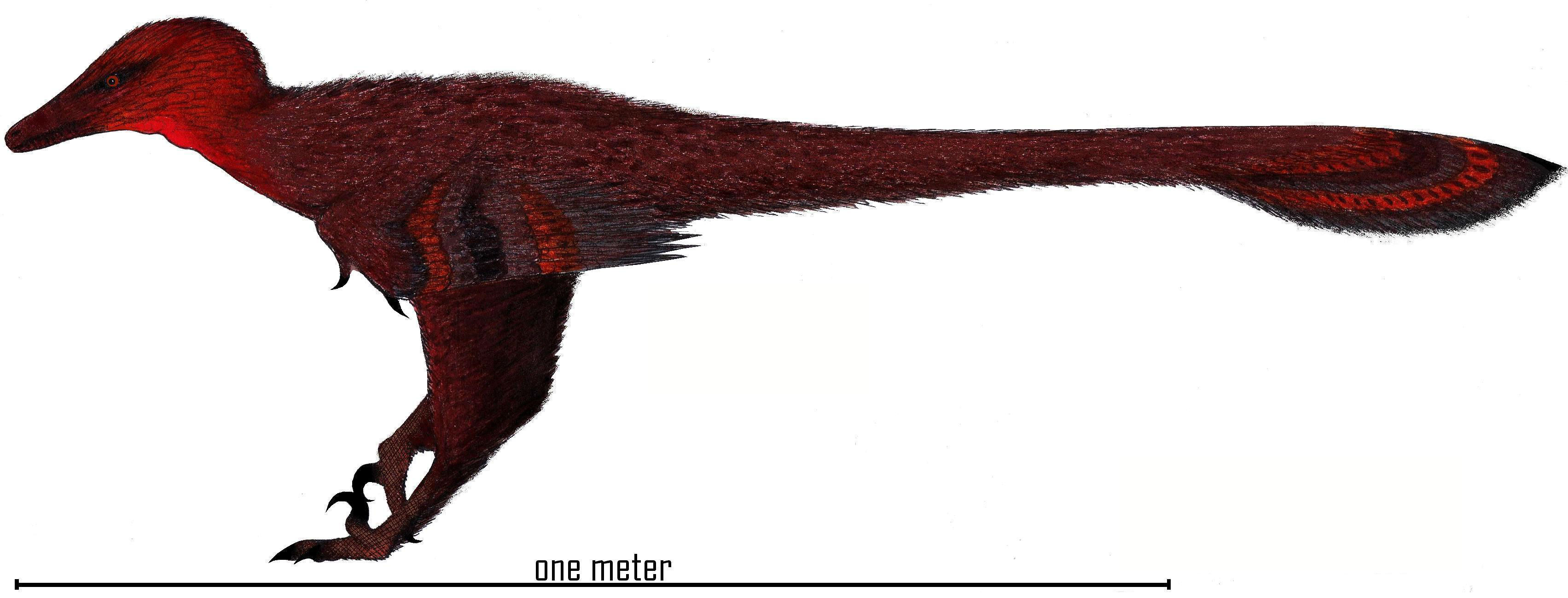
Artist's reconstruction of Shanag ashile as a dromaeosaurid

Shanag was a small predator, measuring about 1.5 metres (4.9 ft) long and weighing around 5 kilograms (11 lb). Shanag shows a mixture of dromaeosaurid, troodontid and basal avialan traits.

The holotype specimen, about six centimeters long, is composed of an associated uncompressed upper and lower jaw fragment, containing a nearly complete right maxilla with teeth, a partial right dentary with teeth and an attached partial splenial. The fossilized teeth in the specimen were pointed with serrations along the lengths of the posterior teeth, but no anterior teeth were available. Shanag is autopomorphic as it lacks promaxillary fenestra and has interalveolar pneumatic cavities, which separates it from its nearest relative of S. millenii. Its teeth have unusually long root lengths, making up about 70% of the overall tooth length.

As part of the Theropoda group, Shanag had hollow bones and feathers. Though most were not capable of flight, some theropods used their feathers to assist in climbing or simply scrambling up tree trunks. Feathers also allowed for thermoregulation by reducing the amount of airflow near the skin and preventing heat loss. Their wings, though not capable of flight, could be used to stabilize themselves while on their prey via flapping like extant raptor birds. Shanag are also believed to be endothermic based on their high speed and high level of activity.

Sharp middle toe (D-II) claws of dromaeosaurs were initially thought to be for disemboweling prey, and then later tests suggested that due to the claw's strength and cutting ability that they were used as a climbing tool for scaling the backs of prey larger than themselves. This claim of scaling was later contested, and it was suggested the claws were used to grip and pin down prey similarly to extant birds of prey.

== Classification ==
In 2007, Turner and colleagues assigned Shanag to the Dromaeosauridae. Their cladistic analysis indicated that it was a basal dromaeosaurid but higher in the tree than the Unenlagiinae. Later analyses recovered it in the Microraptorinae. In 2012, Shanag was recovered as a sister taxon to the Unenlagiinae. In 2013, Agnolín and Novas claimed that the traits of Shanag once used to identify the taxon as a dromaeosaurid closely related to the unenlagiines, were actually found in many other groups of paravian theropods such as the troodontids, avialans, and other basal paravians, with some features suggesting that it is more likely an avialan. Thus, they concluded that Shanag can only be identified as a basal averaptoran.

A 2017 study still recovered Shanag as a dromaeosaurid based on phylogenetic analyses, but as a sister taxon to Laurasian dromaeosaurids from the Late Cretaceous and not related to unenlagiines. In 2019, Agnolín and colleagues argued that Shanag cannot be confidently classified as a dromaeosaurid other than being a paravian. In 2024, Porfiri and colleagues classified Shanag and Pyroraptor as sister taxa to unenlagiines, while Wang and Pei recovered Shanag within Serraraptoria which includes microraptorians and eudromaeosaurians.

== See also ==
- Timeline of dromaeosaurid research
