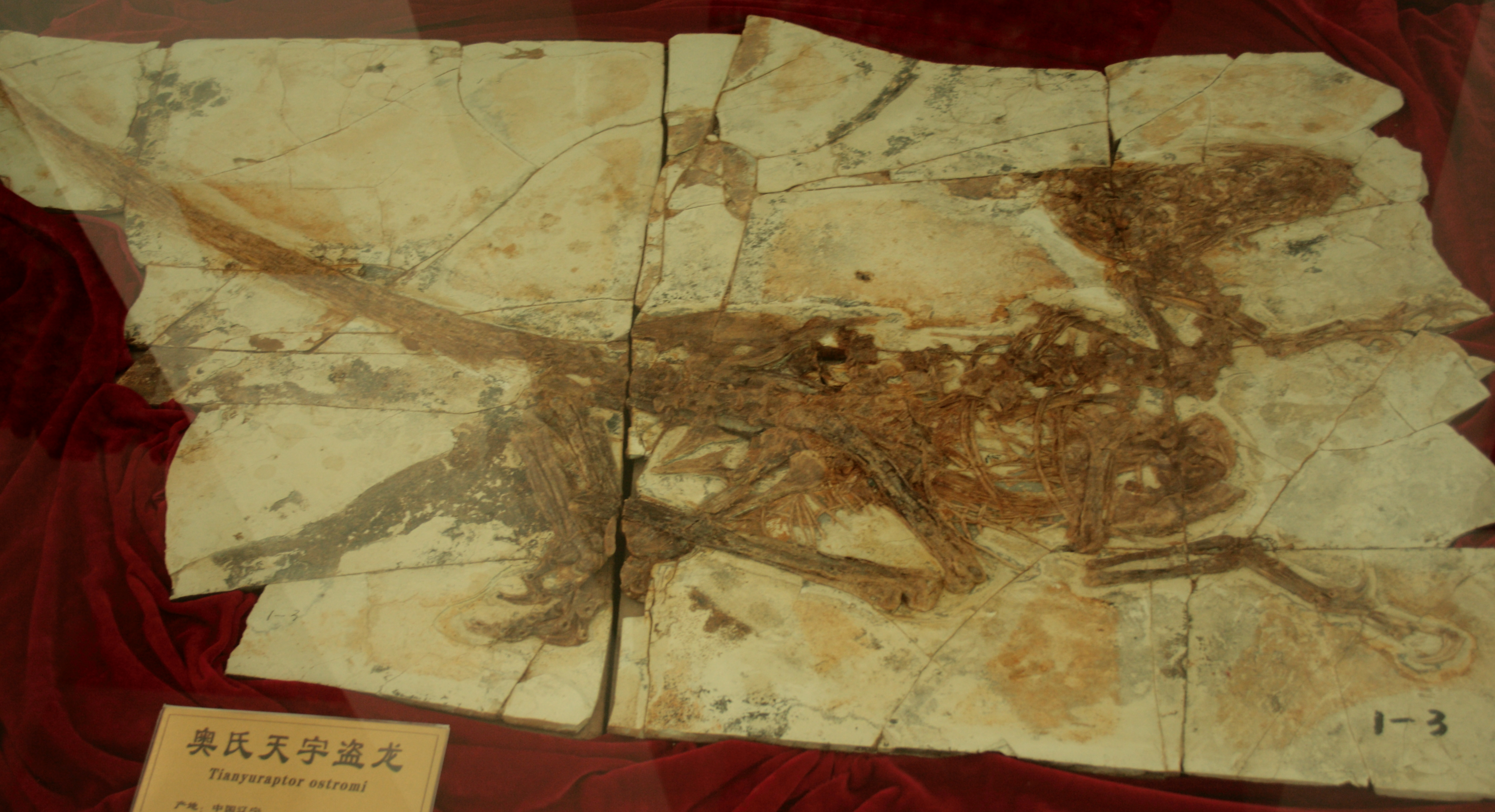
- Holotype specimen

Scientific classification
- Kingdom: Animalia
- Phylum: Chordata
- Class: Reptilia
- Clade: Dinosauria
- Clade: Saurischia
- Clade: Theropoda
- Family: †Dromaeosauridae
- Clade: †Microraptoria
- Genus: †Tianyuraptor; Zheng et al. 2009
- Species: †T. ostromi

Binomial name
- †Tianyuraptor ostromi Zheng et al., 2009

= Tianyuraptor =

Tianyuraptor Temporal range: Early Cretaceous, 122 Ma

Extinct genus of dinosaurs

Tianyuraptor is a genus of short-armed dromaeosaurid dinosaur ('running lizard'; a type of small dinosaur considered to be closely related to birds) that lived during the Early Cretaceous, about 122 million years ago. Its remains have been found in western Liaoning, China. It was similar to other dromaeosaurids found in Liaoning, with the exception of being somewhat more primitive. The type specimen, formally named in 2009, shows features not seen in previously known Northern Hemisphere (Laurasian) dromaeosaurids, but present in Southern Hemisphere (Gondwanan) species and early birds. Because of this, the scientists who first studied Tianyuraptor described it as a "transitional species", bridging the gap between northern and southern types of dromaeosaurid. Tianyuraptor also differs from previously known dromaeosaurids in that it possesses a relatively small furcula ("wishbone"), and unusually short forelimbs.

== Etymology ==
The generic name of Tianyuraptor combines Tianyu, referring to the Shandong Tianyu Museum of Nature where the holotype specimen is stored, with raptor, the Latin word for 'robber', referring to the action of grabbing prey, often used in naming dromaeosaurids. The specific epithet, ostromi, is in honor of John Ostrom, who contributed greatly to the study of dromaeosaurid fossils, including Deinonychus and feathered dinosaurs.

== Description ==
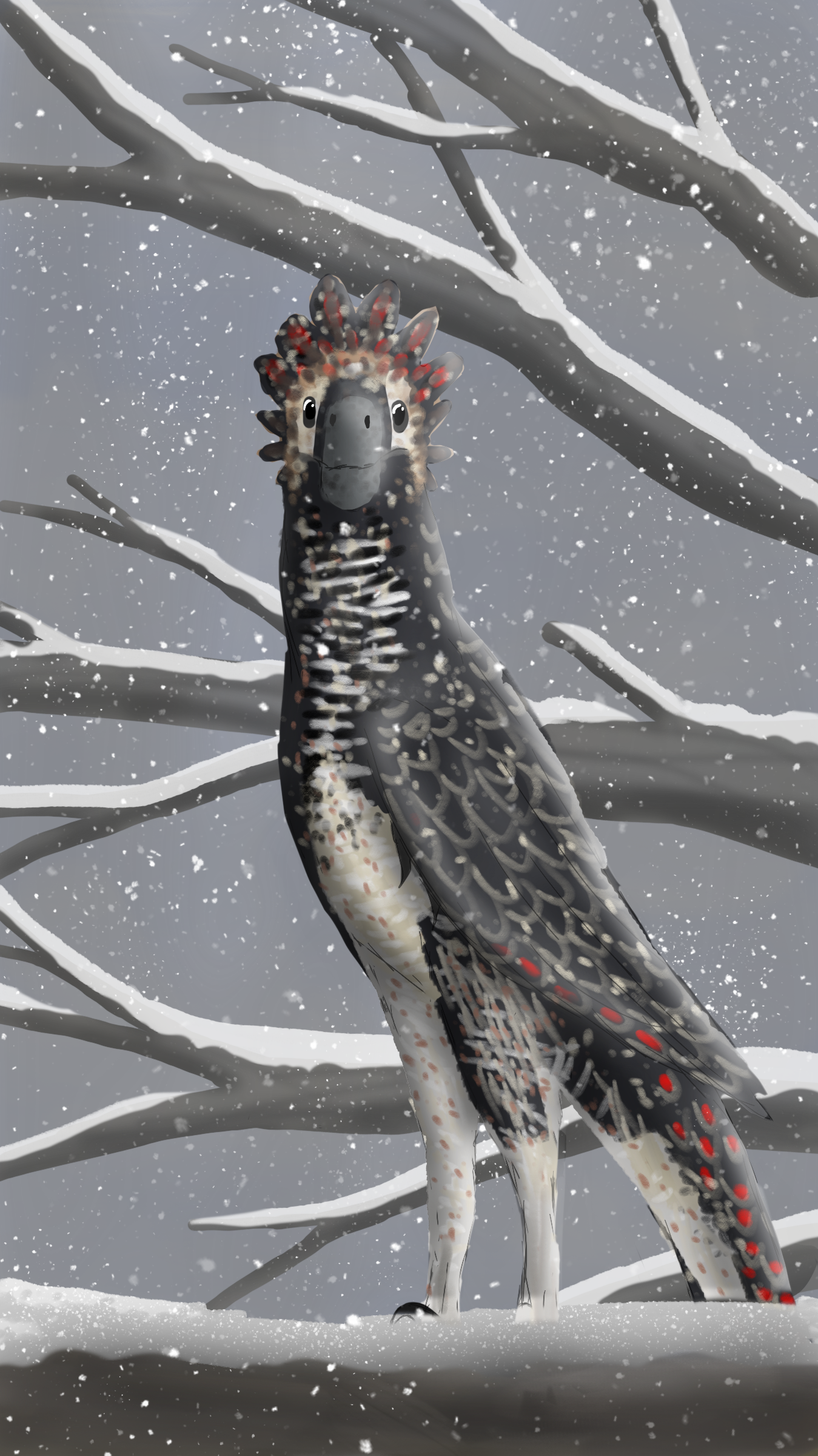
Artist's life restoration

Tianyuraptor is a medium-sized dromaeosaurid that has several derived features that separate it from other dromaeosaurids. These include the length of the middle caudal (tail) vertebrae being more than twice that of the dorsal (back) vertebrae, a small and extremely slender furcula, and an unusually long hindlimb that is roughly three times as long as the entire series of dorsal vertebrae. As in other dromaeosaurid fossils discovered in Liaoning, the tail is relatively long at 960 millimetres (38 in), nearly 4.8 times as long as the femur.

The type specimen is STM1–3, a nearly complete and fully articulated skeleton that is only missing the extreme distal end of the tail. A total of 25 fully articulated caudal vertebrae are preserved and at the end three at most are estimated to be missing. The fossil was discovered in the Dawangzhangzi Bed of the Yixian Formation (Jehol Group), located in Lingyuan in western Liaoning, China. The Yixian Formation is an Early Cretaceous rock unit, dated to between approximately 129.7 and 122.1 million years old, in the Barremian and Aptian faunal stages. The Dawangzhangzi Bed specifically has been dated to about 122 million years ago. STM1–3 is believed to be a sub-adult, with features including the incomplete fusion of skeletal parts during ontogeny. The holotype of Tianyuraptor preserves no soft tissues, unlike many other theropod specimens from the Jehol Group.

=== Limbs ===
The forelimbs are comparatively short, being only 53% of the hindlimbs' length. This differs greatly from the known skeletal elements of other dromaeosaurids, most of which have relatively long forelimbs that are more than 70% of the hindlimbs' length.

While Tianyuraptor is larger in size than all other known microraptorines, it also has relatively elongated lower hindlimbs, like other microraptorines. In this regard, it is different from most other dromaeosaurids, which have relatively short lower legs. For example, Tianyuraptor has a tibiotarsus/femur length ratio of greater than 1.30, while Velociraptor mongoliensis, a creature of similar size, exhibits a ratio of less than 1.10. Aside from elongate hind limbs, Tianyuraptor is different from other members of Microraptorinae in regards to the relative lengths of the forelimb elements. The forelimbs of Tianyuraptor are proportionally much shorter than those of larger dromaeosaurids. For example, a similar-sized Velociraptor specimen shows an arm/leg length ratio of approximately 0.75., while Tianyuraptor has an arm/leg ratio of 0.53.

== Paleobiology ==
The stark difference in arm length compared to other dromaeosaurids implies that the function of the arms in Tianyuraptor was different from that of other dromaeosaurs. Members of the subfamily Microraptorinae, such as Microraptor, have been suggested to have been aerodynamic and may have glided. Microraptorines are usually noted for their long and robust forelimbs and large, asymmetrical flight feathers. However, the shortened forelimbs, small furcula, and the transversely wide coracoid in Tianyuraptor suggest that it was not suited for aerodynamic gliding or flight.

== Classification ==
A phylogenetic analysis performed by Zheng et al. showed Tianyuraptor to be a basal member of a group containing Laurasian dromaeosaurids. Tianyuraptor seems to possess several features that are unknown in other Laurasian dromaeosaurids, but which are seen in basal avialans and Gondwanan dromaeosaurids, including Austroraptor, Buitreraptor, Neuquenraptor, Rahonavis, and Unenlagia. Zheng and colleagues also noted that Tianyuraptor shares some features with the monophyletic subfamily Microraptorinae, though they went on to say that this mixture of features suggests a basal placement for Tianyuraptor within Microraptorinae, as evidenced by their phylogenetic analysis which indicated maximum parsimony in six of the 30 results recovered by the analysis. The authors then go on to suggest that since Tianyuraptor is considered a short-armed microraptorine, more derived long-armed microraptorines might have independently evolved flight capability. However, it is also equally possible, as argued by Zheng et al., that Tianyuraptor may in fact be a basal member of a clade containing all other Laurasian dromaeosaurids with the exception of Microraptorinae. This is indicated by the other 24 out of 30 most parsimonious trees recovered from the analysis. The discovery of Tianyuraptor sheds new light on the early evolution of dromaeosaurs and further exemplifies the great diversity this group enjoyed at an early stage. Agnolín and Novas interpreted the taxon as an averaptoran of uncertain position in 2013. In 2019, Agnolín and colleagues expanded on their position, stating that Tianyuraptor's position in Microraptoria was still uncertain, as though it possessed many microraptorian features, it also shared some features with unenlagiids and avialans.

== See also ==
- Timeline of dromaeosaurid research
- Paraves
