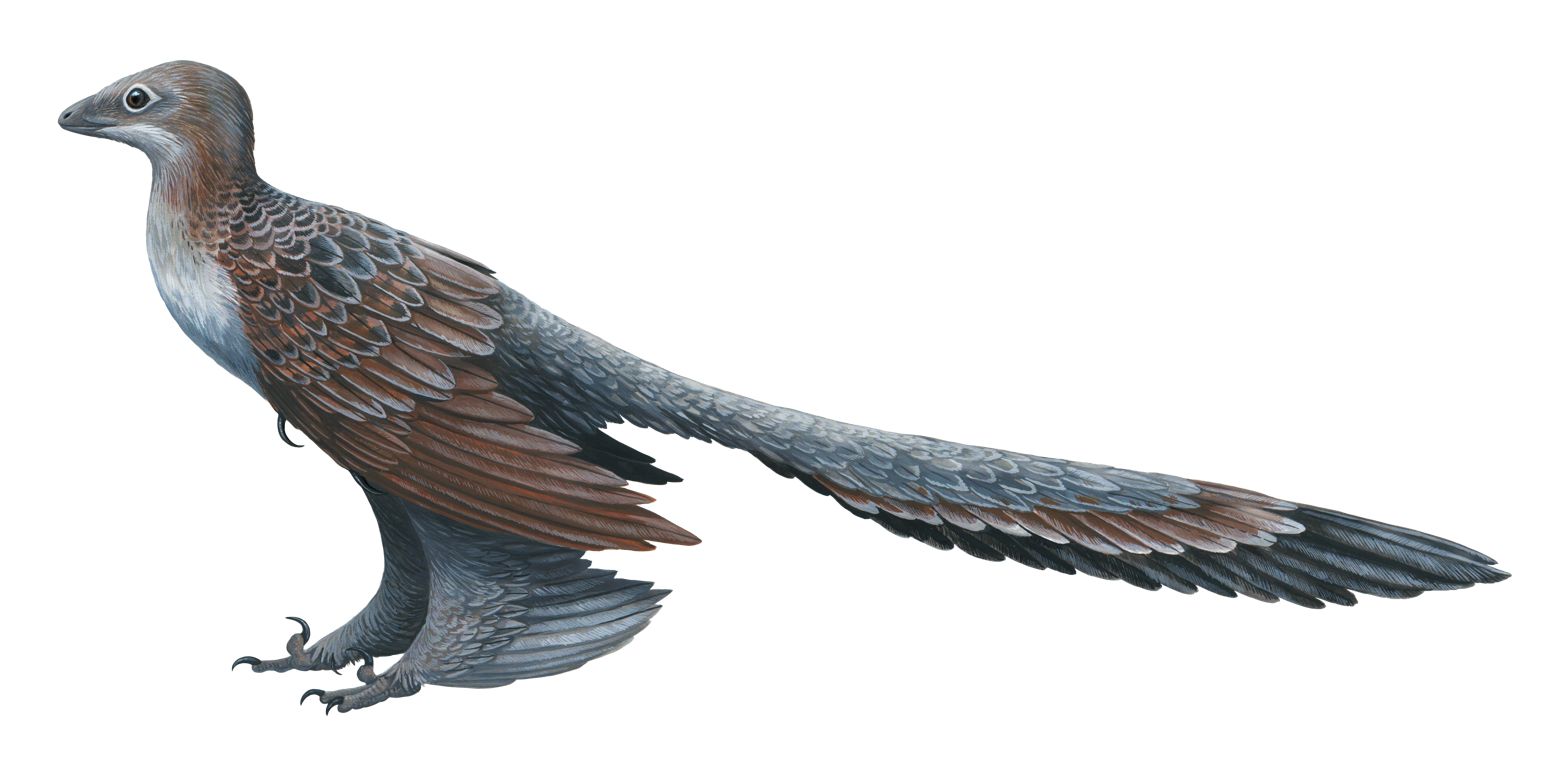
- Life restoration of C. yangi

Scientific classification
- Kingdom: Animalia
- Phylum: Chordata
- Class: Reptilia
- Clade: Dinosauria
- Clade: Saurischia
- Clade: Theropoda
- Family: †Dromaeosauridae
- Clade: †Microraptoria
- Genus: †Changyuraptor; Han et al., 2014

Type species
- †Changyuraptor yangi Han et al., 2014

= Changyuraptor =

Changyuraptor Temporal range: Early Cretaceous, 125 Ma

Extinct genus of dinosaurs

Changyuraptor is a genus of "four-winged", predatory dinosaurs. It is known from a single fossil specimen representing the species Changyuraptor yangi, which was discovered from Early Cretaceous (125 million year old) deposits in Liaoning Province, China. C. yangi belongs to the group of dromaeosaurid theropod dinosaurs called the Microraptoria.

At the time of its discovery, C. yangi was the largest four-winged dinosaur known and among the largest Mesozoic flying paravians, volant true birds seldom approaching its size.

== Description ==
Analysis of the fossil at the University of Cape Town, South Africa reveals that the specimen was a fully grown adult, approximately 1.2 metres (3.9 ft) long and estimated to weigh 4 kilograms (8.8 lb), roughly the size of a turkey. These dimensions make Changyuraptor the largest four-winged microraptorine known, exceeding previously known specimens in size by at least 60%.

Like other microraptorines, Changyuraptor had feathers all over its body, including forelimbs and hindlimbs, which gives the appearance of having two pairs of wings. The presence of long feathers on all four limbs also suggests that these dinosaurs could fly.

The dinosaur's tail is long and feathered, with end feathers up to 29.27 centimetres (11.52 in) long, equalling approximately 30% of the length of the animal's skeleton. This length exceeds the previous record length of 7 inches (18 cm) for feathers from non-avian dinosaurs. The elongated tail feathers are thought to have helped provide softer and safer landings. They could have controlled pitch, a feature useful for a heavier animal, that would have attained a faster gliding speed.

While elongated feathers on the hindlimbs were present in many early birds, such as Archaeopteryx, the morphology of microraptorines suggests a different aerodynamic model from that of modern birds, which have characteristically bald legs and exhibit stable flight using two wings only.

Changyuraptor is thought to have existed alongside a variety of predatory and herbivorous dinosaurs of the Jehol Biota, including Yutyrannus, in moist temperate forest, primarily vegetated by ginkgos and conifers, with hot, dry summers and frosty winters.

== Discovery ==
The fossil, holotype HG B016, was discovered by farmers near Xijianchang in the Early Cretaceous fossil deposits, the Yixian Formation, of the Jehol Biota, located in the Liaoning province of China. From 2012 it was studied by an international team of scientists led by Dr. Luis Chiappe, Director of the Dinosaur Institute Department at the Natural History Museum of Los Angeles County. The holotype consists of a rather complete skeleton with skull, compressed on a plate and counterplate. It shows extensive remains of the integument in the form of pennaceous feathers. In 2014, the specimen was described as the new genus and species Changyuraptor yangi. The generic name of the dinosaur combines the Chinese words for "long feather", 長羽 (cháng yǔ), with Latin raptor ("robber", "seizer"). The specific name honours researcher Professor Yang Yandong.

The Jehol Biota are found in the richest fossil beds for feathered dinosaurs in the world which have yielded notable species such as Yutyrannus huali, a feathered tyrannosauroid with a length of 27 to 30 feet (8.2 to 9.1 m) and the largest feathered dinosaur known to date.

In 2003 Microraptor, a raven-sized dinosaur, approximately 1 kilogram (2.2 lb) in weight, was the first of the microraptorines to be discovered. It shared with species such as Anchiornis and Xiaotingia large feathered limbs and elongated bony tails with long tail feathers. These features caused experts to hypothesize that miniaturisation was an essential evolutionary step to enable flight. Changyuraptor's larger size and weight contradicts that hypothesis. Changyuraptor is also the second four-winged dinosaur to be discovered after Microraptor. Changyuraptor and other microraptorines add to the evidence that dinosaurs had evolved a host of morphological features and behaviours such as feathers, hollow bones, nesting behaviour, and possibly flight, before they evolved in birds.

== See also ==
- Timeline of dromaeosaurid research
