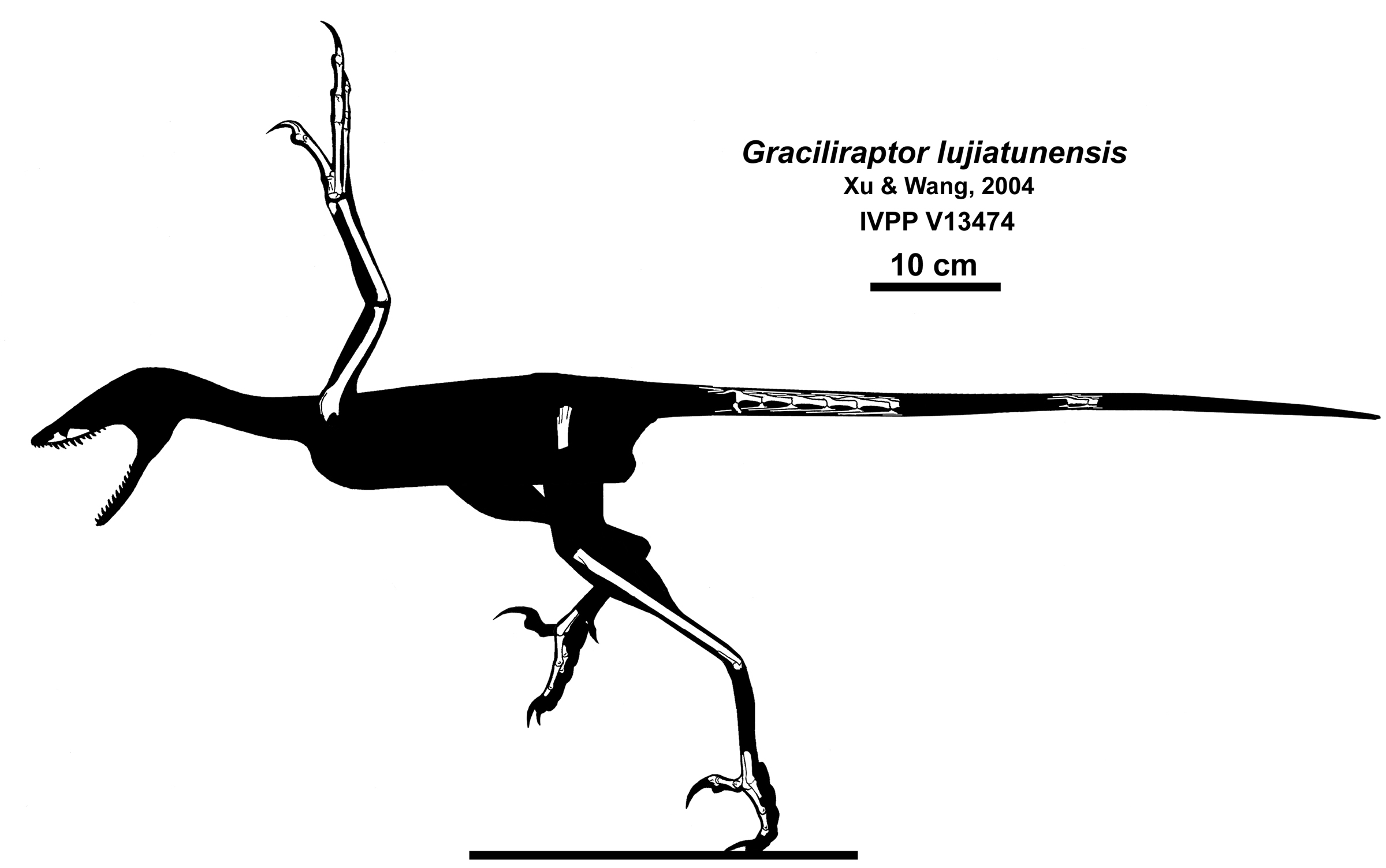
- Skeletal restoration of known remains

Scientific classification
- Kingdom: Animalia
- Phylum: Chordata
- Class: Reptilia
- Clade: Dinosauria
- Clade: Saurischia
- Clade: Theropoda
- Clade: Paraves
- Family: †Dromaeosauridae
- Clade: †Microraptoria
- Genus: †Graciliraptor; Xu & Wang, 2004

Type species
- Graciliraptor lujiatunensis Xu & Wang, 2004

= Graciliraptor =

Graciliraptor Temporal range: Early Cretaceous, 126 Ma

Extinct genus of dinosaurs

Graciliraptor (meaning "graceful thief") is a genus of microraptorian dromaeosaurid dinosaur from the early Cretaceous Period. Its fossil, holotype IVPP V 13474, was found in Beipiao, Liaoning Province, China. The type species is Graciliraptor lujiatunensis, named and described in 2004 by Xu Xing and Wang Xiaoling. The generic name is derived from Latin gracilis (meaning "graceful") and raptor (meaning "thief"). The specific name refers to the village of Lujiatun where the fossil site is located.

== Description ==
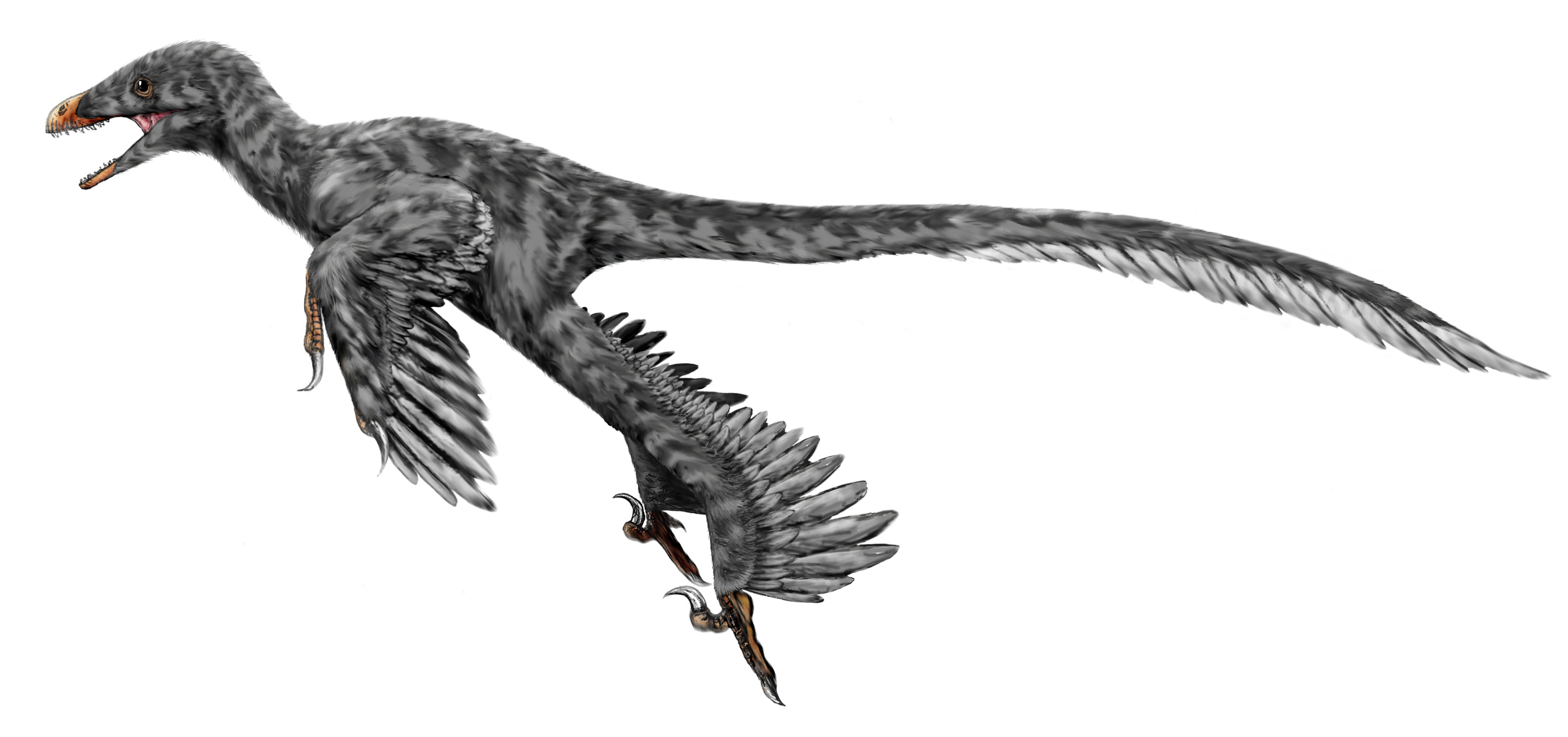
Restoration

The type and only known specimen comprised part of the maxilla with some teeth, nearly complete fore and hind legs; and ten partial tail vertebrae. It is estimated to have been about 90 centimetres (3.0 ft) long in life. In 2010, Gregory S. Paul gave higher estimations of one metre and 1.5 kilogrammes. Graciliraptor is extremely lightly built for a non-avian theropod, with very elongated middle caudal vertebrae and lower leg bones. The femur is thirteen centimetres long and total body length was estimated at one metre. The posterior articular processes of the tail vertebrae, or postzygapophyses, are connected by a thin bone sheath or lamina, that extends to the back over an eighth of the centrum of the following vertebra, thus further stiffening the middle tail, already immobilised by the typical dromaeosaurid long prezygapophyses.

Graciliraptor has been found in the lowest portions of the Yixian Formation, the Lujiatun Member, below the rocks where similar early dromaeosaurids (such as Sinornithosaurus and Microraptor) were found. It is, in geological age, the oldest named dromaeosaurid, and the oldest known from good fossil remains (dromaeosaurid fossils date back all the way to the Middle Jurassic, but consist mostly of teeth).

== Classification ==
As an early dromaeosaurid, Graciliraptor provided information on the early evolution and diversification of the group. It shares several characteristics in common with both early troodontids and avialan birds, supporting a close relationship between avialans, troodontids, and dromaeosaurids.

Xu and Wang considered Graciliraptor to have been closely related to Microraptor, a similar dromaeosaurid from the slightly younger Jiufotang Formation. Later it was placed in the Microraptorinae.

== See also ==
- Timeline of dromaeosaurid research
