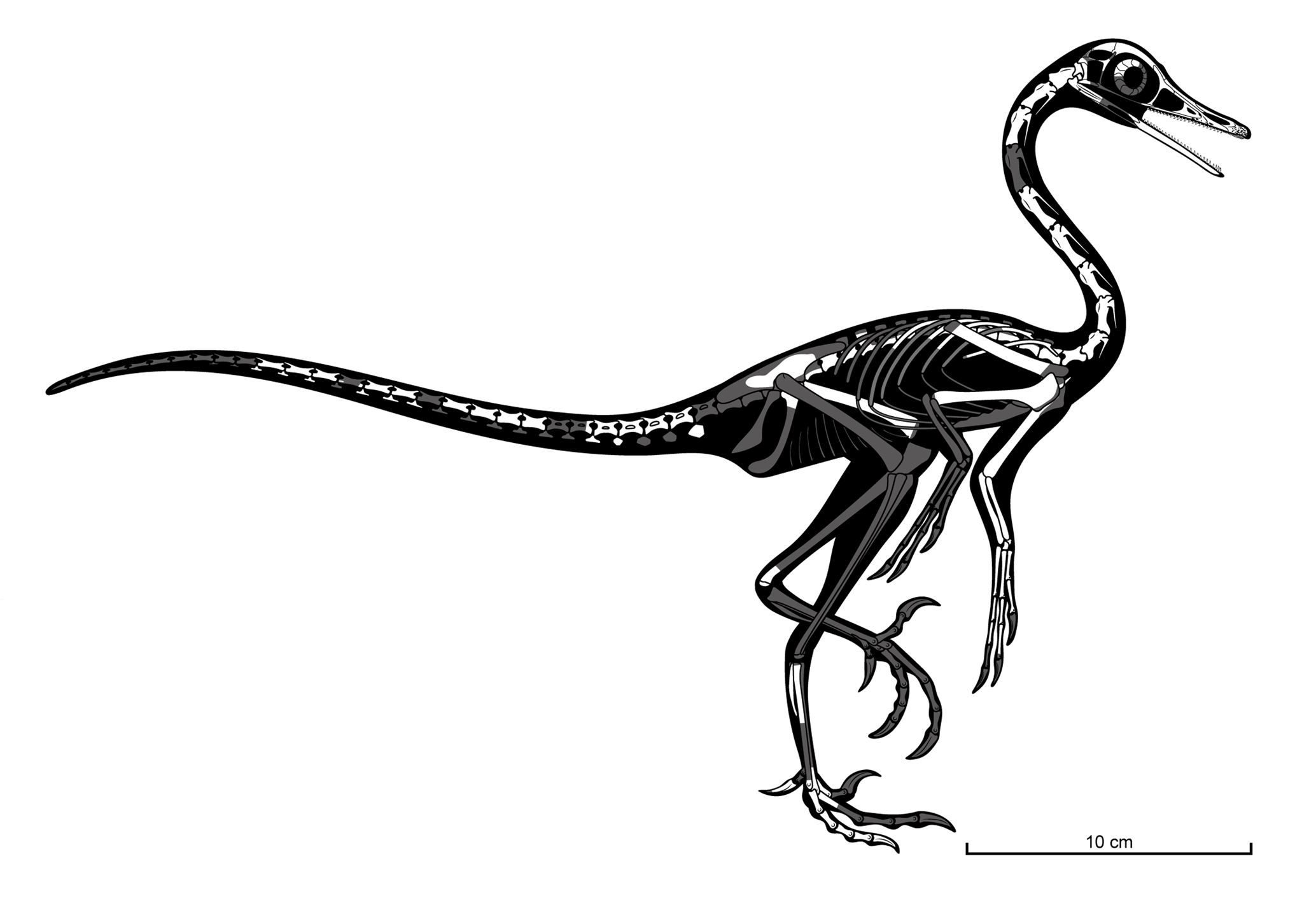
- Skeletal reconstruction, based on the holotype

Scientific classification
- Kingdom: Animalia
- Phylum: Chordata
- Class: Reptilia
- Clade: Dinosauria
- Clade: Saurischia
- Clade: Theropoda
- Clade: †Halszkaraptorinae
- Genus: †Natovenator; Lee et al., 2022
- Species: †N. polydontus

Binomial name
- †Natovenator polydontus Lee et al., 2022

= Natovenator =

Natovenator Temporal range: Maastrichtian, 72–71 Ma

Genus of dromaeosaurid dinosaurs from the Late Cretaceous

Natovenator is a genus of halszkaraptorine dromaeosaurid dinosaur from the Late Cretaceous Barun Goyot Formation of Mongolia. The genus is known from a single species, N. polydontus. Natovenator is crucial to the understanding of halszkaraptorines due to it providing more support for the semi-aquatic lifestyle that has been proposed for this clade. This discovery is important as the semi-aquatic lifestyles of halszkaraptorines (mainly Halszkaraptor) was contested in early 2022.

== Discovery and naming ==
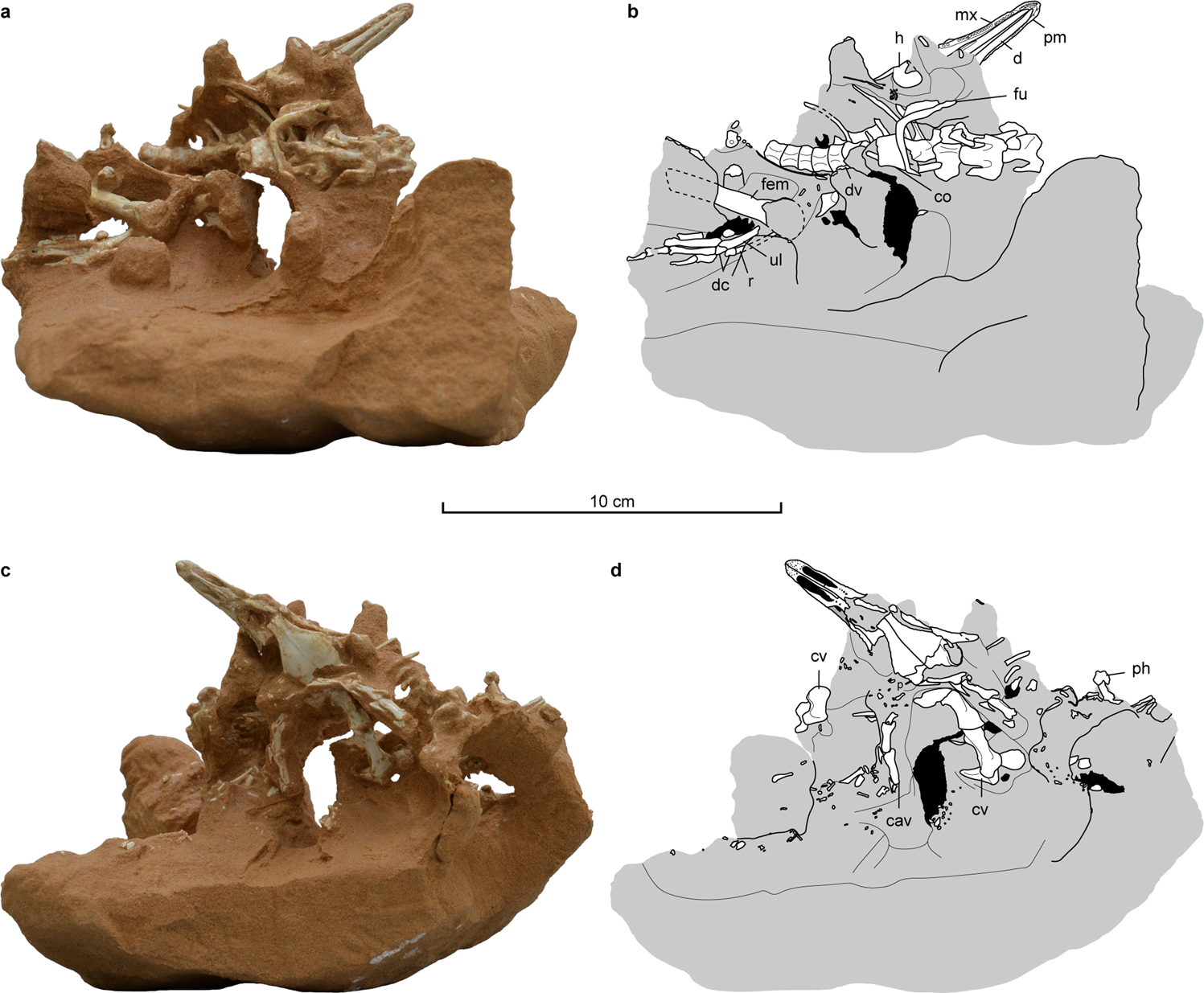
Holotype block

The Natovenator holotype specimen, MPC-D 102/114, was found in sediments of the Barun Goyot Formation of Omnogovi Province, Mongolia. It consists of a mostly articulated skeleton with a nearly complete skull.

The specimen was first mentioned in a 2019 abstract. In 2022, Natovenator polydontus was described as a new genus and species of halszkaraptorine theropod dinosaurs by Sungjin Lee, Yuong-Nam Lee, Philip J. Currie, Robin Sissons, Jin-Young Park, Su-Hwan Kim, Rinchen Barsbold, and Khishigjav Tsogtbaatar based on these remains. The generic name, "Natovenator", is derived from the Latin words "nato", meaning "to swim", and "venator", meaning "hunter", in reference to its piscivorous diet and possible swimming behaviour. The specific name, "polydontus", is derived from the Greek words "polys", meaning "many", and "odous", meaning "tooth".

== Description ==
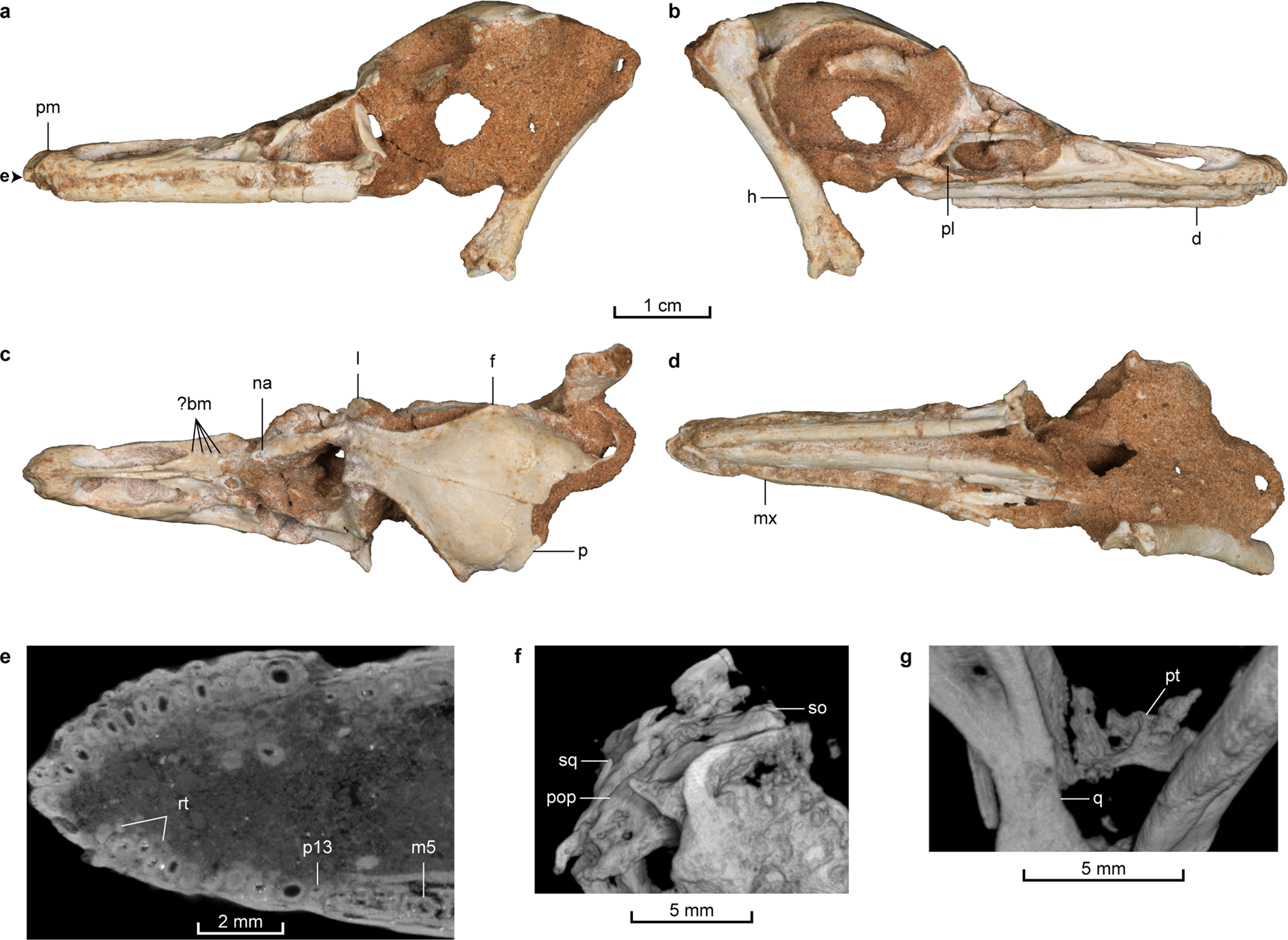
Holotype skull

Natovenator was a very small theropod, comparable in appearance to extant waterfowl, like other members of the Halszkaraptorinae. In the third edition of The Princeton Field Guide to Dinosaurs, Gregory S. Paul stated its length at 0.7 metres (2.3 ft) and weight at 0.3 kilograms (0.66 lb). Natovenator is different from other halszkaraptorines due to features such as a wide groove delimited by a pair of ridges on the anterodorsal surface of the premaxilla, a premaxilla with an elongated internarial process that overlies nasal and extends posterior to the external naris, 13 premaxillary teeth with large and incisiviform crowns, the absence of pleurocoels in cervical vertebrae, and an hourglass-shaped metacarpal II, among other features. The parapophyses in its vertebrae are similar to the extinct Hesperornithiformes, which were toothed diving birds.

== Classification ==
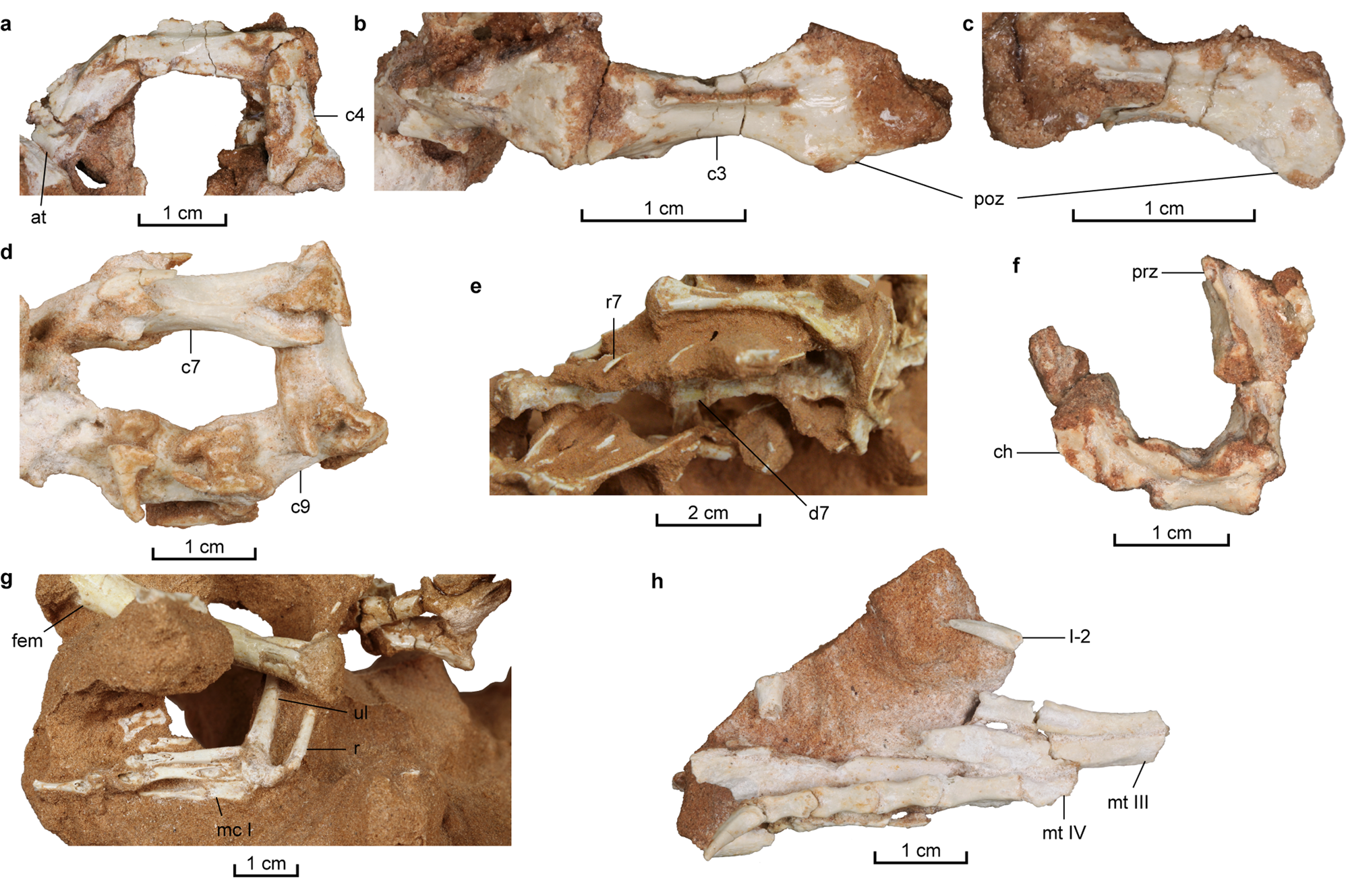
Body elements from the holotype

In their phylogenetic analyses, Lee et al. (2022) recovered Natovenator as a derived member of the Halszkaraptorinae, with Halszkaraptor being the most basal member of the group. The cladogram below displays the results of their phylogenetic analyses.

- Dromaeosauridae
  - Halszkaraptorinae
    - Halszkaraptor
    - - Natovenator
      - Hulsanpes
      - Mahakala
  - - Unenlagiinae
    - - Pyroraptor
      - - Zhenyuanlong
        - Microraptoria
        - - Bambiraptor
          - Eudromaeosauria

== Paleobiology ==
=== Aquatic habits ===
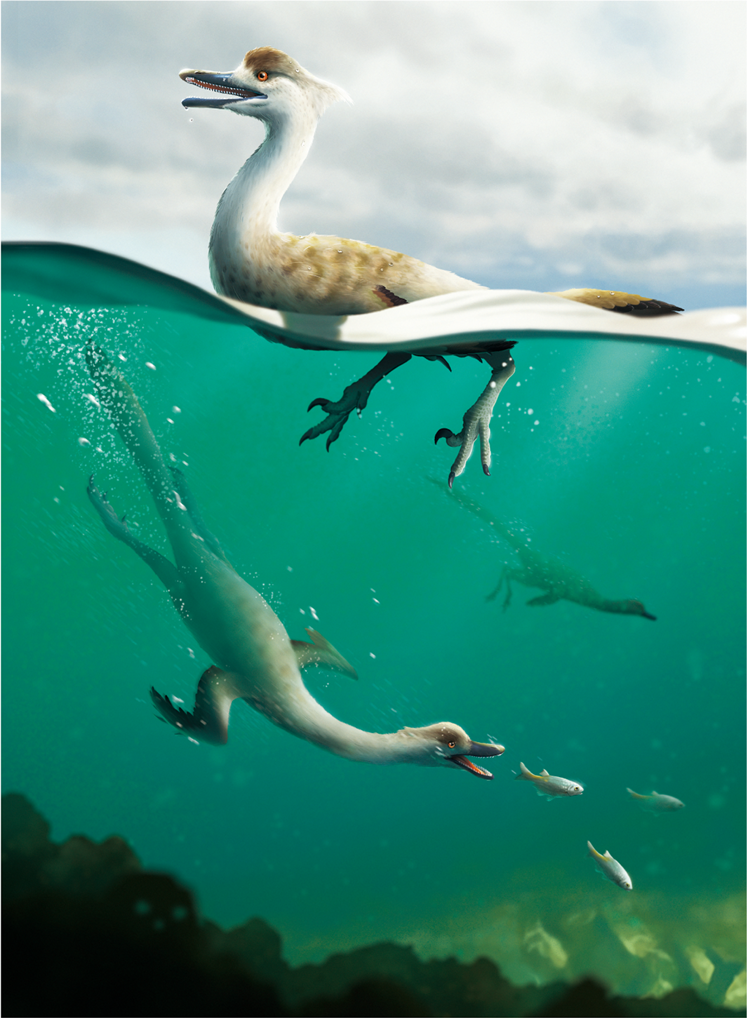
Life restoration of Natovenator

In 2022, Lee and colleagues regarded Natovenator as an efficient swimming dromaeosaurid with a semiaquatic lifestyle. The multiple convergences with other aquatic vertebrates include an elongated snout with numerous teeth, delayed replacement pattern of premaxillary teeth, a complex neurovascular system on the snout tip, elongated neck and vertebral zygapophyses, and a retracted, long naris (nostril opening). The team indicated that the delayed pattern of the premaxillary dentition could have allowed it to keep providing enlarged teeth in Natovenator, in a similar way to sauropterygians. Similar to many modern-day diving birds, the neck of Natovenator was rather long, likely useful in catching/snatching prey. Most notably, its dorsal rib cage had posteriorly-oriented ribs, providing a streamlined shape that is also known in efficient diving birds, mosasaurs, choristoderes, and spinosaurids. Even though the exact aquatic locomotion of Natovenator is unknown, Lee and colleagues suggested that its forelimbs acted as flippers for propulsion when swimming.

== Paleoenvironment ==
The Barun Goyot Formation is regarded as Late Cretaceous in age (Upper Campanian) based on sediments and fossil content. This formation is mostly characterized by red beds, mostly light-coloured sands (yellowish, grey-brown, and to a lesser extent reddish) that are well-cemented. Sandy claystones (often red-coloured), siltstones, conglomerates, and large-scale trough cross-stratification in sands are also common across the unit. In addition, structureless, medium-grained, fine-grained and very fine-grained sandstones predominate in sediments of the Barun Goyot Formation. Overall geology of the formation indicates that sediments were deposited under relatively arid to semiarid climates in alluvial plain (flat land consisting of sediments deposited by highland rivers), lacustrine, and aeolian paleoenvironments, with addition of other short-lived water bodies.

The Barun Goyot Formation was also home to many other vertebrates, including the ankylosaurids Saichania, Tarchia and Zaraapelta; alvarezsaurids Khulsanurus, Ondogurvel, and Parvicursor; birds Gobipipus, Gobipteryx and Hollanda; dromaeosaurids Kuru and Shri devi; fellow halszkaraptorine Hulsanpes; protoceratopsids Bagaceratops and Breviceratops; pachycephalosaurid Tylocephale; oviraptorids Conchoraptor, Heyuannia and Nemegtomaia; and the large sauropod Quaesitosaurus.

== See also ==
- Timeline of dromaeosaurid research
