= Ningyuansaurus =

Ningyuansaurus Temporal range: Early Cretaceous, 124.6 Ma

Scientific classification
- Kingdom: Animalia
- Phylum: Chordata
- Class: Reptilia
- Clade: Dinosauria
- Clade: Saurischia
- Clade: Theropoda
- Clade: Pennaraptora
- Genus: †Ningyuansaurus; Ji et al., 2012

Type species
- †Ningyuansaurus wangi Ji et al., 2012

Extinct genus of dinosaurs

Ningyuansaurus is a pennaraptoran dinosaur genus. It contains the single species Ningyuansaurus wangi, known from a fossil specimen from the Early Cretaceous Yixian Formation (Aptian stage, 124.6 Ma ago) of Jianchang, western Liaoning Province, People's Republic of China. It was originally thought to be the basalmost species of oviraptorosaur, based on its long skull and a greater number of teeth in comparison to any other known oviraptorosaur. However, later research showed that it is a member of Halszkaraptorinae. The generic name Ningyuansaurus is derived from Ningyuan, an ancient name for Xingcheng City. The specific name honors Wang Qiuwu, the private owner of the specimen who donated it for scientific study. The specimen is now in the Confuciusornis Museum in Xingcheng.

== Description ==
The only known fossil specimen of N. wangi is notable for having a large number of teeth compared to more advanced oviraptorosaurs, but the teeth in the back of the upper jaw (maxilla) are still reduced in number compared to most other non-avialan theropods. The reduced number of maxillary teeth in Ningyuansaurus is shared with the scansoriopterygids and other basal oviraptorosaurs such as Incisivosaurus. Though the skull is poorly preserved, the specimen preserved at least 14 teeth in the lower jaw (dentary) and 10 teeth in the upper jaw, four in the premaxilla and six in the maxilla. The teeth were closely packed together and lacked serrations. The eyes were relatively large. The skull was generally triangular in shape but longer than other basal oviraptorosaurs like Caudipteryx, with a straight lower jaw unlike most other oviraptorosaurs.

The arms were short, with longer upper arms (humeri) than lower arms (ulna). The legs were long, and the upper leg (femur) was longer than the pelvic bones. The tail was relatively long and feather impressions were found near the tip. Additional feather impressions were identified along the neck.

== Phylogeny ==
Ji et al., 2012 considered Ningyuansaurus a basal member of Oviraptorosauria. However, some traits, such as the low iliofemoral ratio, low ischiopubic ratio and enlarged pedal ungual II are more similar to paravians. While a 2016 study recovered it as an oviraptorosaur, the only non-oviraptorosaur taxa are Archaeopteryx, Velociraptor and Herrerasaurus and the study does not recover a paravian Velociraptor.

The 2019 description of Hesperornithoides, which contains many oviraptorosaurs, recovers Ningyuansaurus as the sister taxon of Mahakala within Halszkaraptorinae:

- Unenlagiidae
  - Unenlagiinae
  - Halszkaraptorinae
    - - Ningyuansaurus
      - Mahakala
    - - ISMD-VP09
      - Halszkaraptor

In their phylogenetic analyses, Cau and Madzia (2021) placed Ningyuansaurus within varied positions. While the implied weighting parsimony analyses recovered it as a basal oviraptorosaur in agreement with Ji et al. (2012), the unweighted parsimony analyses recovered Ningyuansaurus within Sinovenatorinae as reproduced below:

- Troodontidae
  - - Sinovenatorinae
      - Jinfengopteryx
      - - Ningyuansaurus
        - - Sinovenator
          - Mei
    - - - Sinusonasus
        - Sinornithoides
      - - - Jianianhualong
          - - Hesperornithoides
            - - Daliansaurus
              - - MPC-D 100/44
                - Luanchuanraptor
                - Liaoningvenator
        - - Byronosaurus
          - - Borogovia
            - Troodontinae
              - - Xixiasaurus
                - - Zanabazar
                  - Saurornithoides
              - - Albertavenator
                - Talos
                - Stenonychosaurus
                - Gobivenator
                - Almas
                - - Philovenator
                  - Linhevenator

== Diet ==
Numerous small oval-shaped structures were found in the body cavity of the type specimen, each 10 millimetres (0.39 in) or less in diameter. These may be the remains of seeds, indicating that N. wangi was at least partially a seed-eater.

== See also ==
- Timeline of oviraptorosaur research
