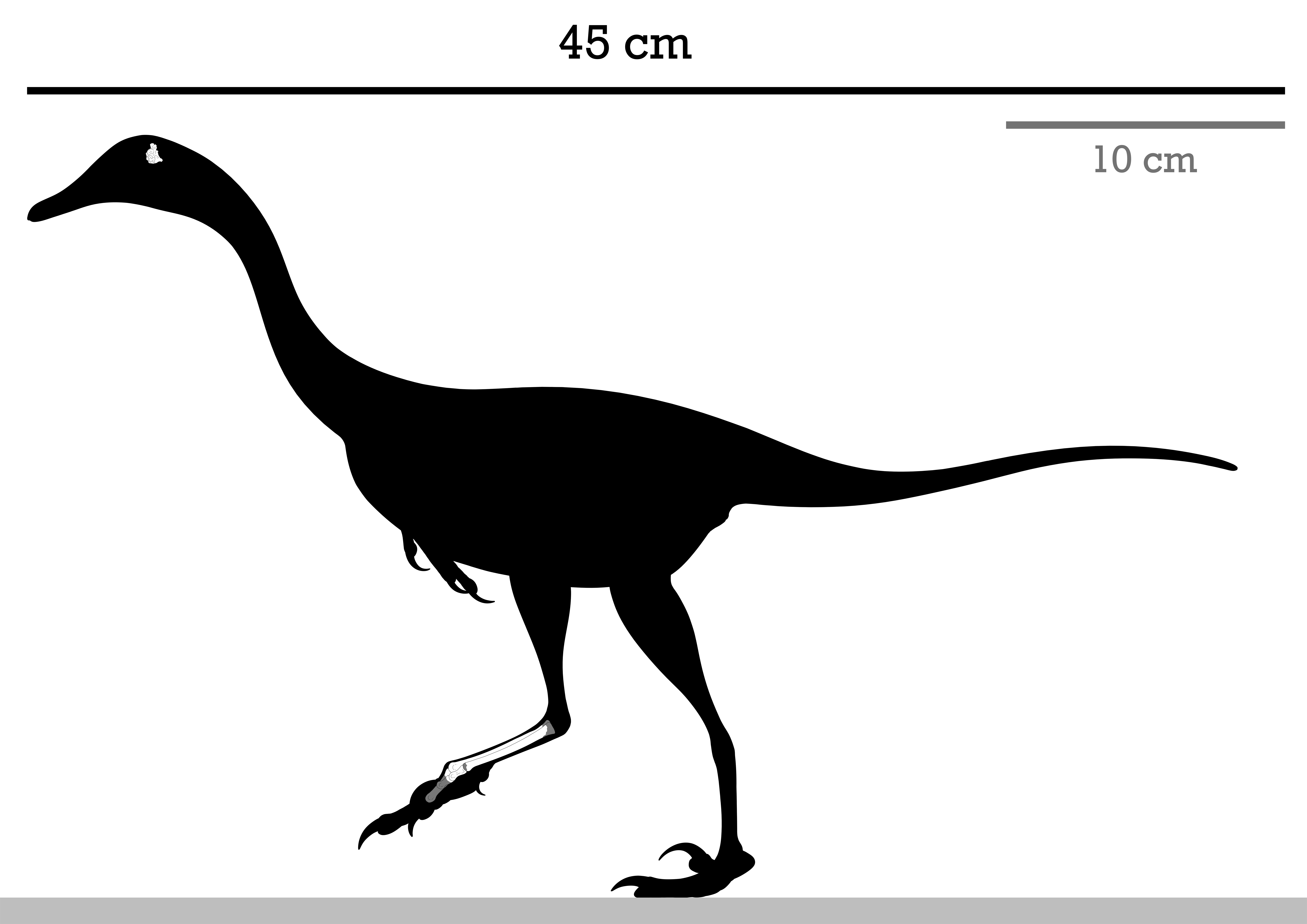
- Skeletal diagram of ZPAL MgD-I/173

Scientific classification
- Kingdom: Animalia
- Phylum: Chordata
- Class: Reptilia
- Clade: Dinosauria
- Clade: Saurischia
- Clade: Theropoda
- Clade: Eumaniraptora
- Clade: †Halszkaraptorinae
- Genus: †Hulsanpes; Osmólska, 1982

Type species
- †Hulsanpes perlei Osmólska, 1982

= Hulsanpes =

Hulsanpes Temporal range: Late Cretaceous, 75–72 Ma

Extinct genus of dinosaurs

Hulsanpes (meaning "Khulsan foot") is a genus of halszkaraptorine theropod dinosaurs that lived during the Late Cretaceous in what is now the Barun Goyot Formation of Mongolia, about 75-72 million years ago. The remains were found in 1970 and formally described in 1982 by Halszka Osmólska, who noted that the genus is represented by an immature individual. Hulsanpes represents the first record of the basal dromaeosaurid subfamily Halszkaraptorinae.

== History of discovery ==
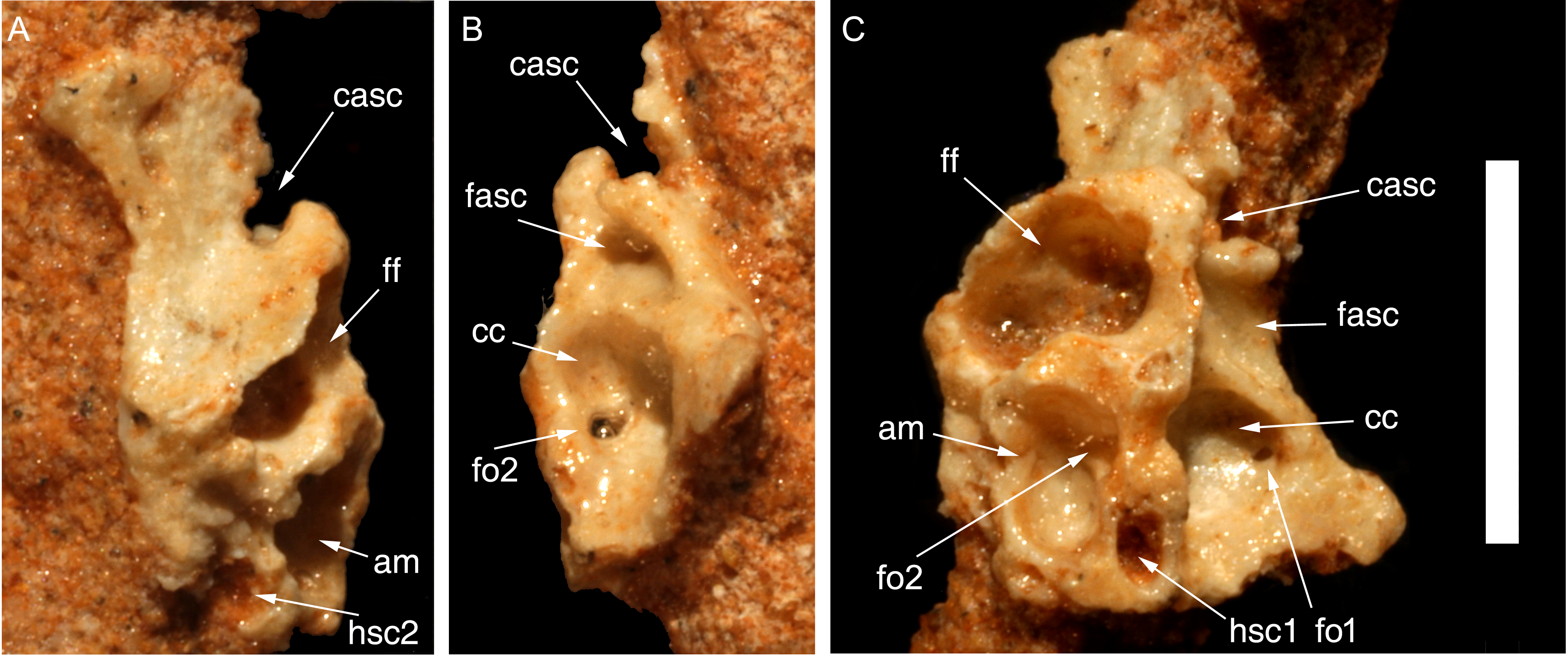
Right partial wall of the braincase

The first fossil remains of Hulsanpes were discovered in 1970 during the third Polish-Mongolian expedition at Khulsan in the Gobi Desert. Twelve years later, the type species, Hulsanpes perlei, was named and described by the Polish palaeontologist Halszka Osmólska in 1982. Hulsanpes is based on the holotype fossil specimen ZPAL MgD-I/173, uncovered in a sandstone layer of the Barun Goyot Formation, dating from the Late Campanian (roughly 72 million years ago). It consists of a partial braincase fragment and the right metatarsus composed by the second, third and fourth metatarsals and three pedal phalanges from an apparently immature individual. Osmólska mentioned the braincase as preserved in the holotype but this element was never described. Based on the unusual morphology of the metatarsus and second phalanges she concluded that Hulsanpes represented a deinonychosaur taxon, but due to the lack of more material, she tentatively classified the genus as a dromaeosaurid taxon. In an etymological aspect, the generic name, Hulsanpes, can be translated as "Khulsan pes" and is derived from the Latinized name of the type locality Khulsan and the Latin pēs meaning "foot" (Hulsan + pēs). The specific name, perlei, is in honour to the veteran Mongolian paleontologist Altangerel Perle.

== Description ==
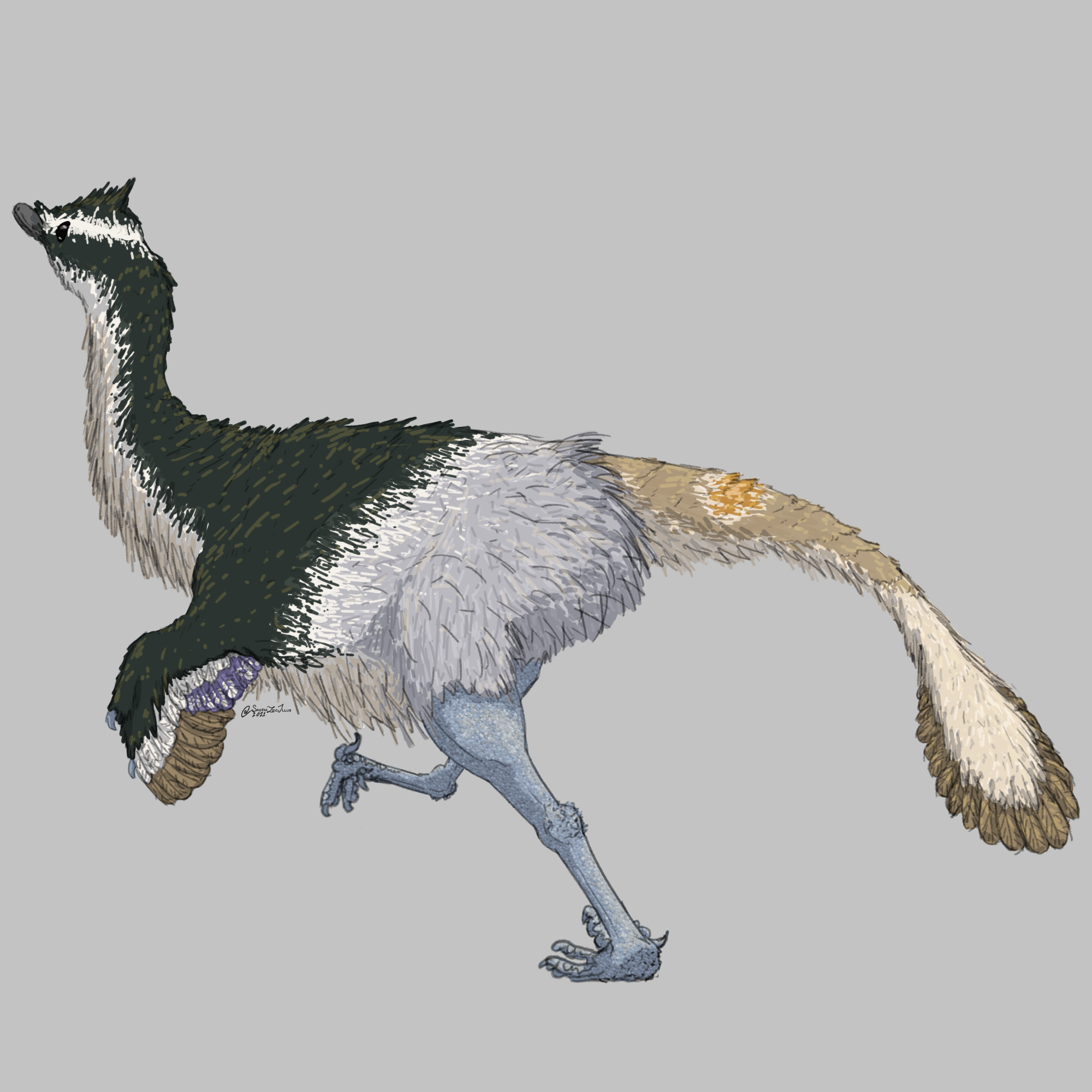
Artist's reconstruction of Hulsanpes running

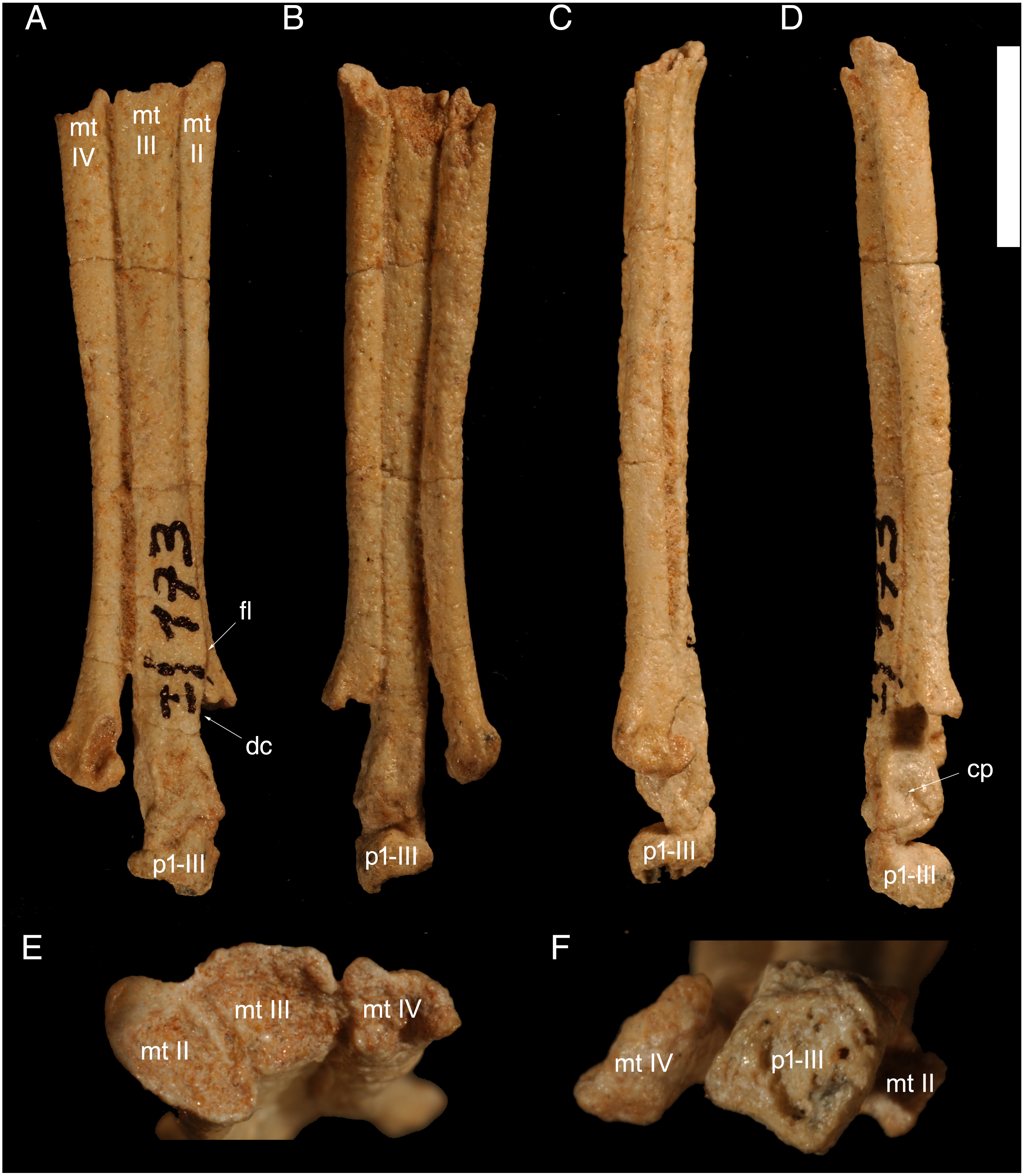
Right metatarsus and phalanx of metatarsal III in articulation

The holotype specimen is represented by a very small immature individual and therefore all the available data is somewhat limited. The roughly textured bones are indicators of an early stage of life, probably a post-hatchling chick. The genus itself can be distinguished in having the contact area of metatarsal III and IV straight in a frontal view and the lower end of metatarsal IV projected to the lower lateral side.

Overall, the preserved right metatarsus is a gracile and compact element with the three main metatarsals only lacking the first one, in all metatarsals the upper end is slightly eroded. Although compact, the third metatarsal is not pinched at the upper end, indicating that the metatarsus was not arctometatarsalian. Metatarsals II, III and IV are similar in length (3.4 cm (34 mm), 3.9 cm (39 mm) and 3.6 cm (36 mm) respectively), although the third one is the longest. There are three pedal phalanges preserved but only one being complete. The first phalanx of metatarsal III is very eroded missing most of its lower part but preserving the upper one; it remains articulated to the metatarsal. The first phalanx of metatarsal II is complete but the second one is severely damaged, lacking most of the lower region, however, it is articulated to the first phalanx.

The partial braincase is a small element, measuring just 1 cm (10 mm) in length, it is embedded in a small portion of the sandstone layer. In general, the morphology is very complex and has an irregular shape. Based on comparisons with other maniraptorans, the preserved portion can be identified as the right inner side of the prootic-opisthotic bones in the braincase.

== Classification ==
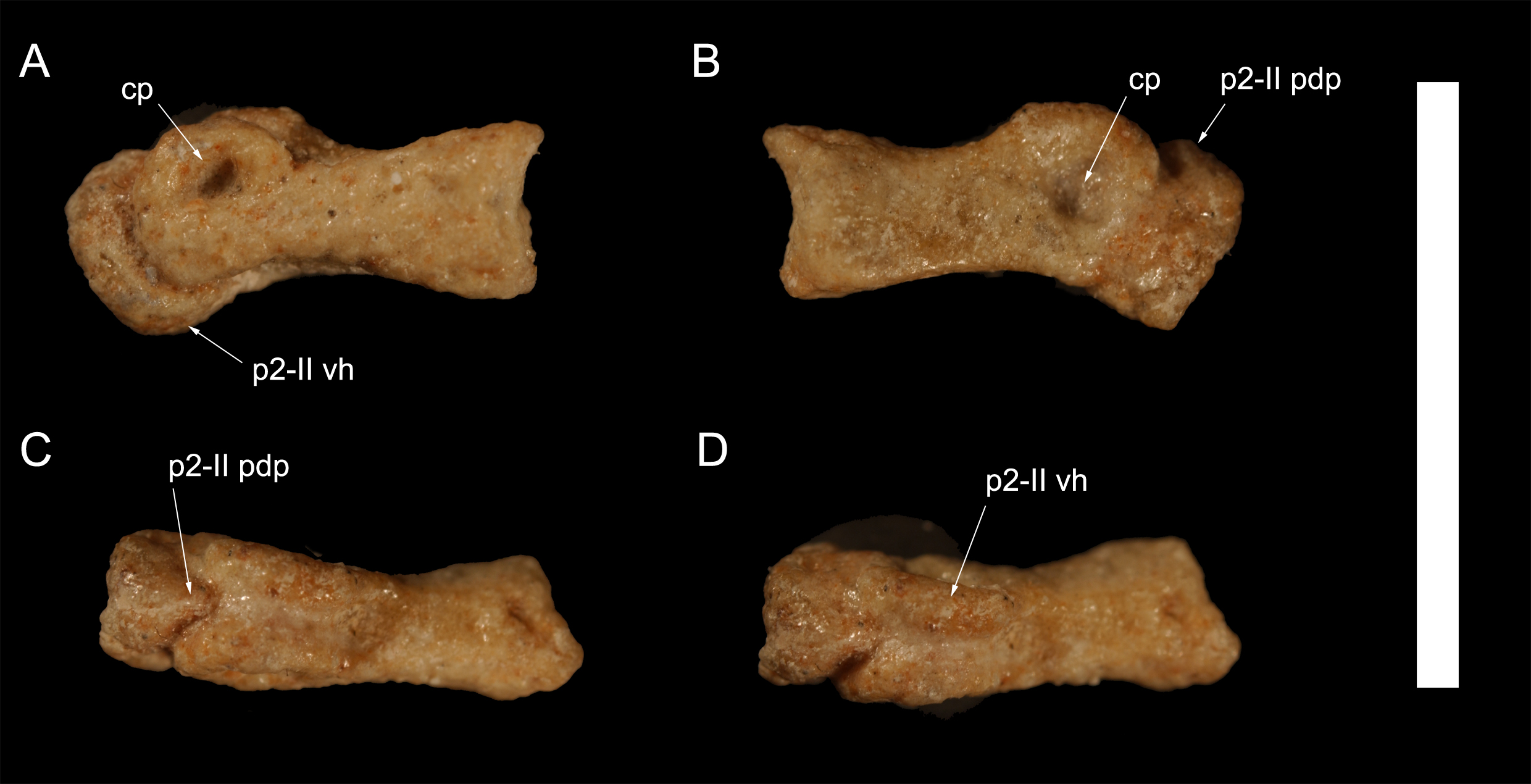
First and second phalanges of metatarsal II

When first described in 1982, Osmólska tentatively placed Hulsanpes within the Dromaeosauridae. Several features of the specimen were, according to Osmólska, too "primitive" for it to be a genuine bird taxon such as the lack of fusion of the metatarsals except in the lower region but this might partly be due to the young age of the individual specimen. Although its juvenile nature is reminiscent of a miniature individual of Velociraptor, and though these traits are plesiomorphic, it might still belong to another, non-avian, maniraptoran lineage besides Dromaeosauridae. A 2004 phylogeny of Dromaeosauridae recovered Hulsanpes as a dromaeosaurid (due to a coding error for Sinovenator), but Agnolin and Novas in 2013 assigned it to Averaptora incertae sedis based on the fact that the extremely gracile metatarsals are similar to Avialae and metatarsal III interpreted to be pinched at the upper region. This latter statement has been proven to be incorrect though.

After several inconsistencies surrounding the placement of the genus, in 2017 during the description of Halszkaraptor a new clade, the Halszkaraptorinae, was coined by Cau and colleagues, containing the new genus Halszkaraptor and its close relatives which were identified as being the long enigmatic Hulsanpes and Mahakala. The analysis showed that the Halszkaraptorinae was the most primitive known dromaeosaurid group, slightly related to unenlagiines. Hulsanpes occupied a derived position within the Halszkaraptorinae as the sister species of Mahakala. The cladogram below is based on the results obtained in the phylogenetic analysis performed during the description using updated data from the Theropod Working Group:

- Dromaeosauridae
  - - Halszkaraptorinae
      - Halszkaraptor
      - - Mahakala
        - Hulsanpes
    - - - Unenlagiinae
          - Austroraptor
          - - Buitreraptor
            - Neuquenraptor
            - Unenlagia comahuensis
            - Unenlagia paynemili
      - - Shanag
        - - Zhenyuanlong
          - - - Microraptoria
                - Changyuraptor
                - NGMC 91
                - Graciliraptor
                - Microraptor
                - Sinornithosaurus
                - Hesperonychus
              - - Eudromaeosauria
                  - Bambiraptor
                  - - Tianyuraptor
                    - - - Dromaeosaurinae
                          - Achillobator
                          - - Utahraptor
                            - Dromaeosaurus
                      - Velociraptorinae
                        - Adasaurus
                        - - - Deinonychus
                            - Saurornitholestes
                          - - Velociraptor
                            - - Tsaagan
                              - Linheraptor

== Paleobiology ==
Hulsanpes has been re-classified as a halszkaraptorine taxon, updating various aspects about the life-style of these animals. Hulsanpes had a similar life-style to those of the modern-day sawbills or waterfowls, spending most of their time in aquatic environments (such as rivers) using fore and hindlimb-assisted swimming. But like all dinosaurs, they come up onto land to reproduce and laid eggs in terrestrial nests. However, it appears to be that Hulsanpes may have been more terrestrial based on the holotype metatarsus, which features adaptations for a more subcursorial life-style, supporting the diversification within this subfamily.

== Paleoecology ==
The holotype specimen was recovered from the Barun Goyot Formation at the type location of the formation, the Khulsan locality. This formation is interpreted to date back to the Middle-Late Campanian stage of the Late Cretaceous period, about 72 million to 75 million years ago. Most of the environments present consisted of large rivers with other water bodies, and prominent dune-like terrains. Here, Hulsanpes shared their habitat with diverse dinosaurs such as Bagaceratops, Gobipteryx, Parvicursor, Saichania, Tarchia and Tylocephale. The locomotory specializations of Hulsanpes may suggest a reduced source competition with other species in the formation.

== See also ==
- Timeline of dromaeosaurid research
