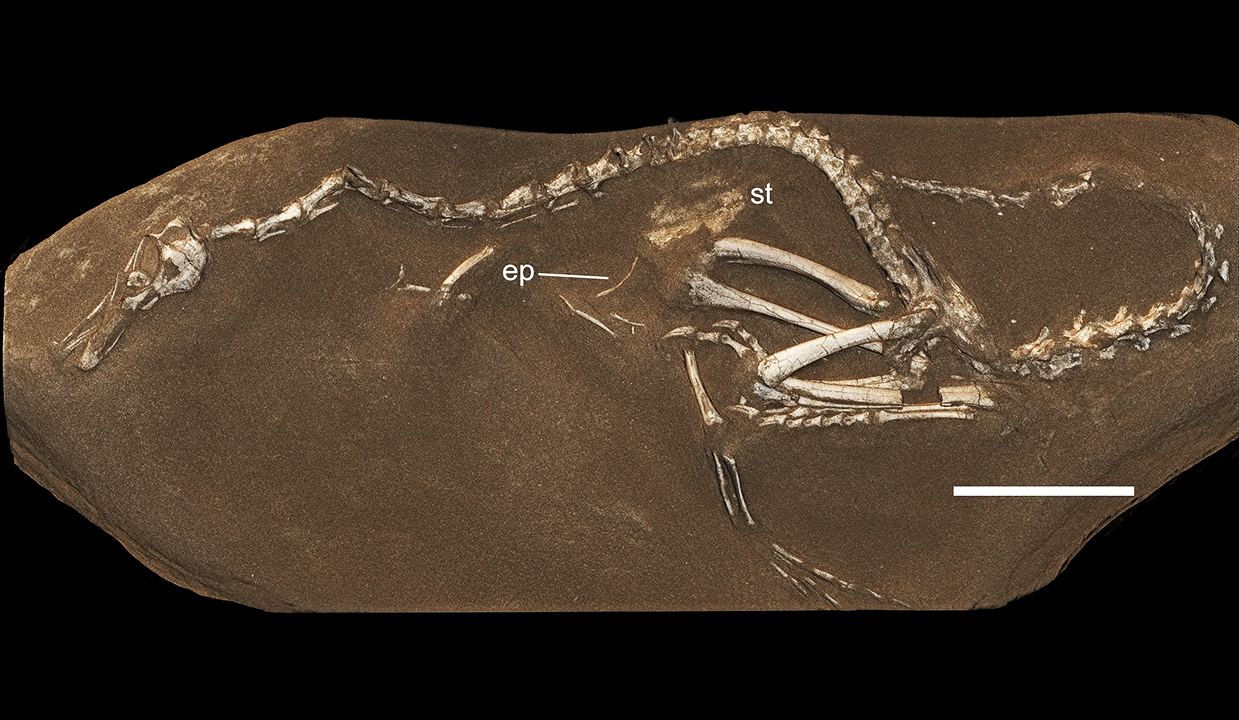
- Holotype specimen of Halszkaraptor escuilliei

Scientific classification
- Kingdom: Animalia
- Phylum: Chordata
- Class: Reptilia
- Clade: Dinosauria
- Clade: Saurischia
- Clade: Theropoda
- Clade: Eumaniraptora
- Clade: †Halszkaraptorinae; Cau et al., 2017

Type genus
- †Halszkaraptor escuilliei Cau et al., 2017

Genera
- †Halszkaraptor; †Hulsanpes; †Mahakala; †Natovenator; †Ningyuansaurus?

Synonyms
- Halszkaraptoridae? Motta et al., 2025

= Halszkaraptorinae =

Halszkaraptorines Temporal range: Late Cretaceous, 75–71 Ma Possible Early Cretaceous record

Extinct subfamily of dinosaurs

Halszkaraptorinae is an extinct basal ("primitive") subfamily of Dromaeosauridae (or possibly Unenlagiidae) that includes the enigmatic genera Halszkaraptor, Natovenator, Mahakala, and Hulsanpes. Halszkaraptorines are definitively known only from Late Cretaceous strata in Asia, specifically in Mongolia. It is debated among researchers whether the group had a semiaquatic lifestyle.

== History of discovery ==
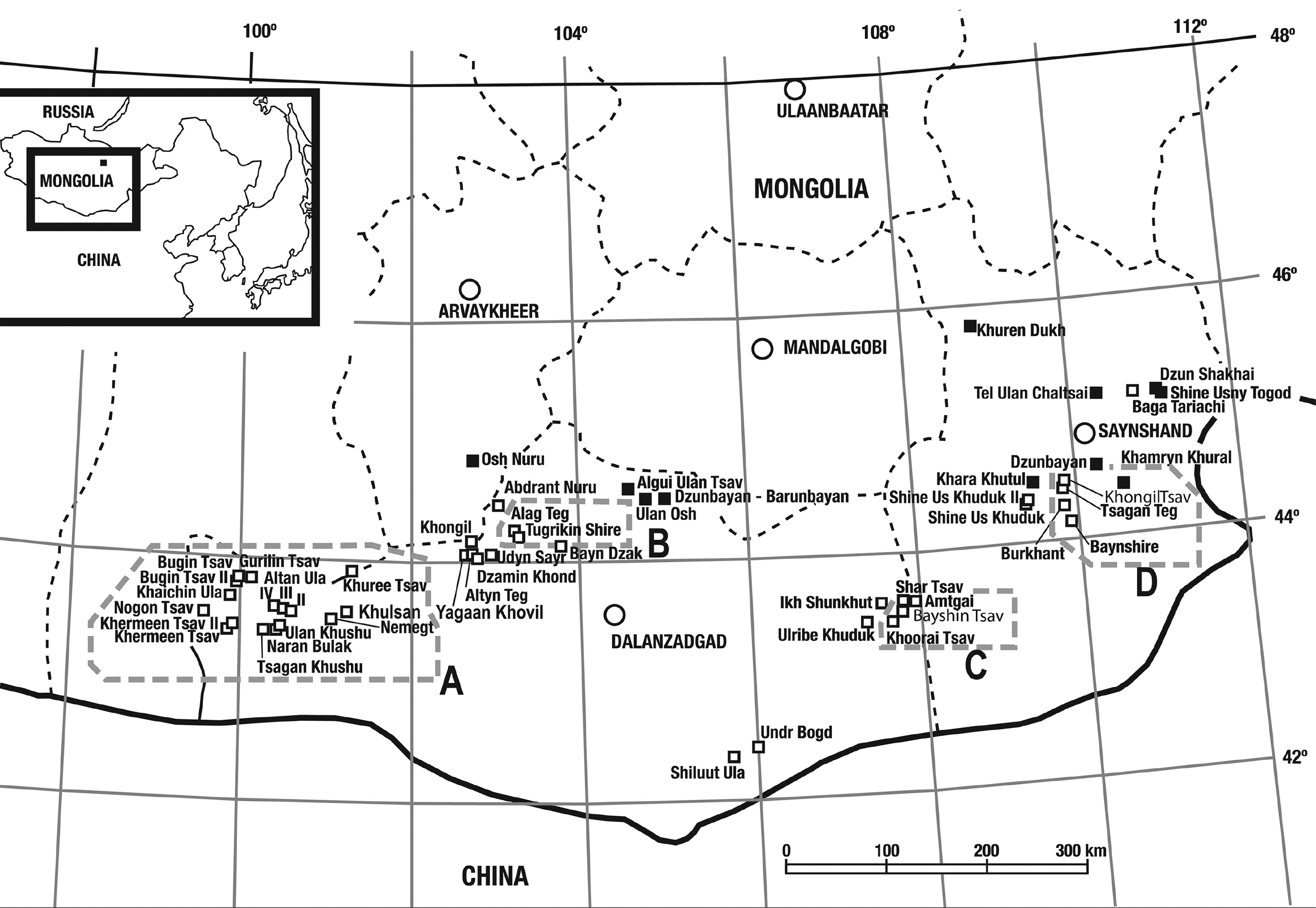
Cretaceous-aged fossil localities of Mongolia; Halszkaraptorine fossils have been collected at the Khulsan (area A), Tugrik Shireh, and Ukhaa Tolgod localities (area B)

The first known remains of halszkaraptorines were found in sandstone sediments in 1970 during a Polish-Mongolian expedition at the Barun Goyot Formation, Gobi Desert. Later in 1982, they were described by Polish palaeontologist Halszka Osmólska and used as the holotype for the new genus and species Hulsanpes perlei, honoring the Mongolian paleontologist Altangerel Perle. Although the affinities of these fossils were not fully understood, they were tentatively interpreted as belonging to Deinonychosauria. In 1992 dromaeosaurid-like fossils were recovered from the Tugriken Shire locality of the Djadokhta Formation and described as a new species in 2007 by Alan H Turner and team. This new taxon, Mahakala omnogovae, was regarded as a primitive dromaeosaurid mainly based on its body proportions. In 2015 the Royal Belgian Institute of Natural Sciences received a small theropod fossil specimen, hailing from England and Japanese private collections. The specimen, through negotiations between the former institute, Eldonia and Mongolian authorities, was lastly returned to the Institute of Paleontology and Geology, Mongolian Academy of Sciences. According to associated documents of the specimen, it was illegally poached from the Djadokhta Formation (Ukhaa Tolgod locality; however, sediments may suggest that, alternatively, it was recovered from nearby Bayn Dzak locality) during an unknown year, eventually falling into private collections. The specimen was formally described in 2017 by Andrea Cau with colleagues, naming the genus and species Halszkaraptor escuilliei, in honor of Halszka Osmólska and François Escuillié, paleontologists who made negotiations for returning the poached specimen to Mongolia possible. With the naming of Halszkaraptor, the subfamily Halszkaraptorinae was also coined to contain this taxon and relatives, namely Hulsanpes and Mahakala.

== Description ==
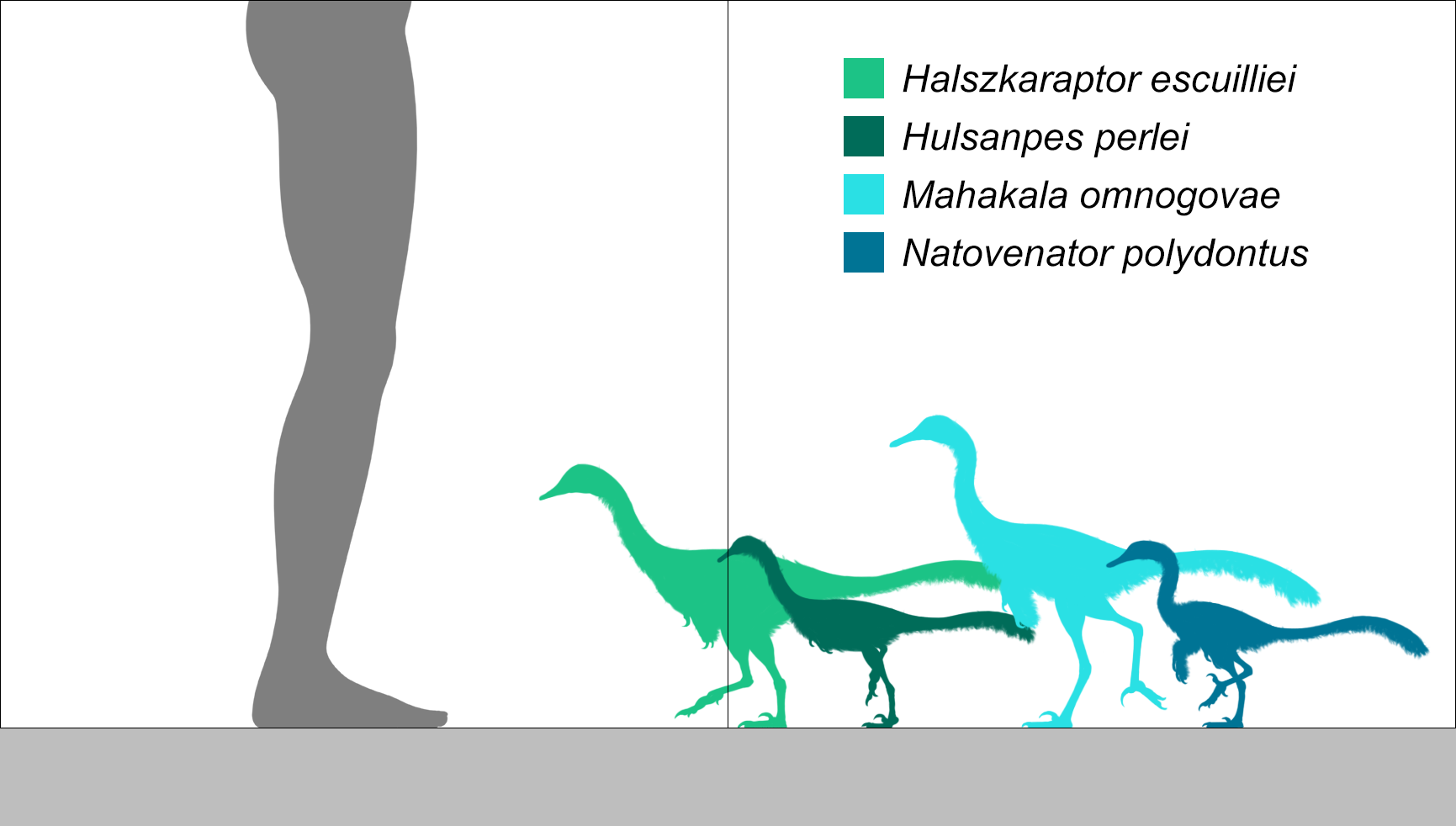
Size of known halszkaraptorines compared to a human

Halszkaraptorines were relatively small theropods, reaching lengths similar to those of modern-day ducks. They are diagnosed by their long necks, proximal caudal vertebrae with oriented articular processes (projections of the vertebra fits with an adjacent vertebra) and prominent zygapophyseal laminae (plates of bone that form the posterior walls of each vertebra), a flattened ulna with a sharp posterior margin, ilium with a shelf-like supratrochanteric (above the trochanter of the femur) process, metacarpal III shaft transversely as thick as that of metacarpal II, a posterodistal surface on the femoral shaft with an elongate fossa bound by a lateral crest and the proximal half of metatarsal III being unconstricted and markedly convex anteriorly.

== Classification ==
Halszkaraptorinae is defined as the most inclusive clade that contains Halszkaraptor escuilliei but not Dromaeosaurus albertensis, Unenlagia comahuensis, Saurornithoides mongoliensis or Vultur gryphus. The cladogram below is based on the phylogenetic analysis conducted in 2022 by Lee et al. in their description of Natovenator.

- Dromaeosauridae
  - Halszkaraptorinae
    - Halszkaraptor
    - - Natovenator
      - Hulsanpes
      - Mahakala
  - - Unenlagiinae
    - - Pyroraptor
      - - Zhenyuanlong
        - Microraptoria
        - - Bambiraptor
          - Eudromaeosauria

In 2025, Motta et al., (2025) recovered Halszkaraptorinae (which they elevate to family level) (along with Unenlagiidae, Anchiornithidae, and Archaeopteryx) as within Avialae. The two trees recovered are reproduced below:

Consensus Improved (equal weighting)

- Pennaraptora
  - - Scansoriopterygidae
    - Oviraptorosauria
  - Paraves
    - Troodontidae
    - Eumaniraptora
      - Dromaeosauridae
        - Microraptoria
        - Eudromaeosauridae
      - Avialae
        - Unenlagiinia
          - Halszkaraptoridae
          - Unenlagiidae
        - - - Anchiornithidae
            - Archaeopteryx
          - - Jeholornis
            - Pygostylia

Consensus Improved (implied weighting)

- Pennaraptora
  - - Scansoriopterygidae
    - Oviraptorosauria
  - Paraves
    - Troodontidae
    - Eumaniraptora
      - Dromaeosauridae
        - Microraptoria
        - Eudromaeosauridae
      - Avialae
        - Unenlagiinia
          - Halszkaraptoridae
          - Unenlagiidae
        - - Anchiornithidae
          - - - Fujianvenator
              - Archaeopteryx
            - - Jeholornis
              - Pygostylia

== Paleobiology ==
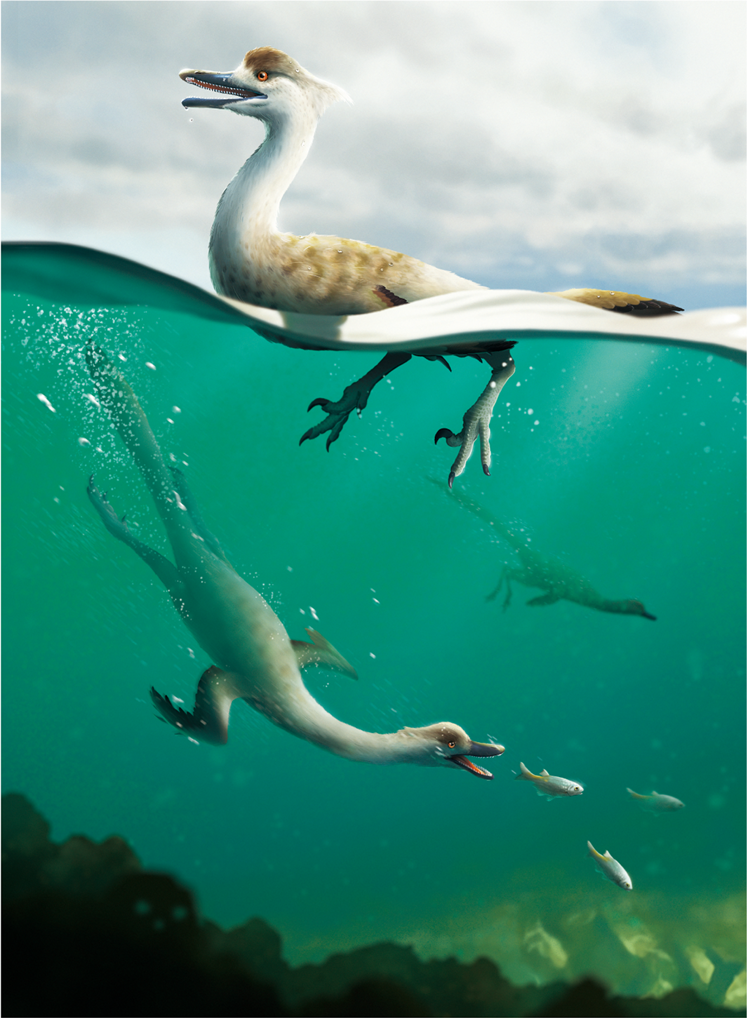
Life restoration of Natovenator

In 2017 a comparison of the fossils of Halszkaraptor with the bones of extant crocodilians and aquatic birds revealed evidence of a semiaquatic lifestyle. Cau and colleagues suggested that halszkaraptorines were obligate bipeds on land, but also swimmers that used its forelimbs to push through water and used their long necks for foraging. Such traits allowed them to exploit both terrestrial and aquatic paleoecosystems. A 2024 study by Tse, Miller, and Pittman, focusing on the skull morphology and bite forces of various dromaeosaurids discovered that Halszkaraptor had a rapid bite unsuited to piscivorous feeding as previously hypothesized based on its skull morphology, and instead suggest it was an insectivore that hunted small invertebrates possibly in low-light conditions (at night or in murky water), since it likely had exceptional low-light vision among dromaeosaurids based on its relatively large orbit size.

Other researchers have either disagreed with or merely followed Cau's interpretation as a semiaquatic dinosaur. In 2019, Brownstein argued that the features noted for Halszkaraptor do not directly support its ability to swim. He also suggested that this dinosaur may be a basal dromaeosaur with transitional features, although Cau rebutted his claims a year later. In 2021, Hone and Holtz noted that since Halszkaraptor and many modern aquatic birds with no flattened unguals is said to be semi-aquatic, having flattened unguals like Spinosaurus do not necessarily suggest that the animal can swim; they didn't propose their own view on this dinosaur's potential ability to swim. In 2022, Fabbri and his colleagues argued against a semi-aquatic ecology for Halszkaraptor, noting that it had low bone density, a trait not observed in semi-aquatic animals. In response, Cau has pointed out on his blog that swans similarly have low bone density yet have adaptations for semi-aquatic feeding.
