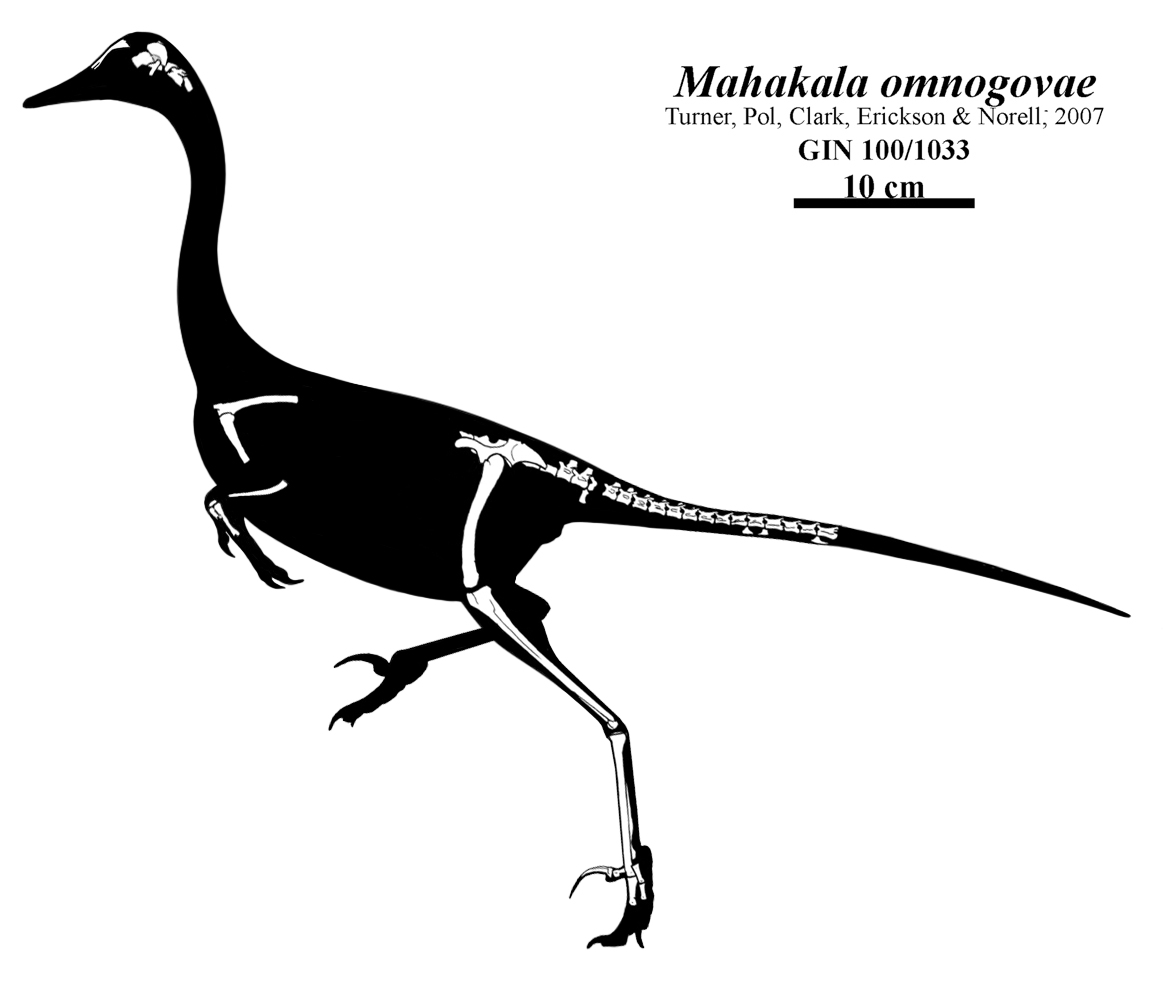
- Diagram of known elements from the holotype

Scientific classification
- Kingdom: Animalia
- Phylum: Chordata
- Class: Reptilia
- Clade: Dinosauria
- Clade: Saurischia
- Clade: Theropoda
- Clade: Eumaniraptora
- Clade: †Halszkaraptorinae
- Genus: †Mahakala; Turner et al., 2007

Type species
- †Mahakala omnogovae Turner et al., 2007

= Mahakala omnogovae =

Mahakala Temporal range: Late Cretaceous, 75 Ma

Extinct species of dinosaur

Mahakala (from Sanskrit महाकाल, pronounced [mɐɦaːˈkaːlɐ]) is a genus of halszkaraptorine theropod dinosaur from the Campanian-age (about 80 million years ago) Upper Cretaceous Djadokhta Formation of Ömnögovi, Mongolia. It is based on a partial skeleton found in the Gobi Desert. Mahakala was a small dromaeosaurid, and its skeleton shows features that are also found in early troodontids and avialans. Despite its late appearance, it is among the most basal dromaeosaurids. Its small size, and the small size of other basal deinonychosaurians, suggests that small size appeared before flight capability in birds. The genus is named for Mahakala, one of eight protector deities (dharmapalas) in Tibetan Buddhism.

== Description ==
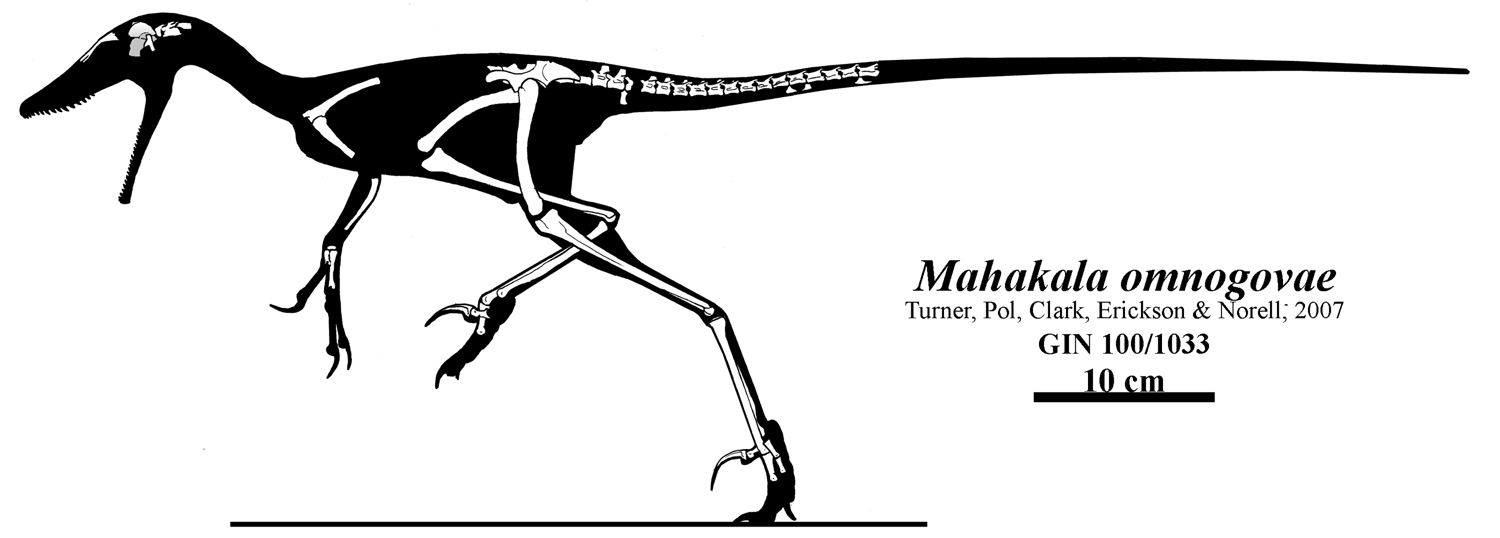
2009 skeletal reconstruction of Mahakala as a generic deinonychosaur

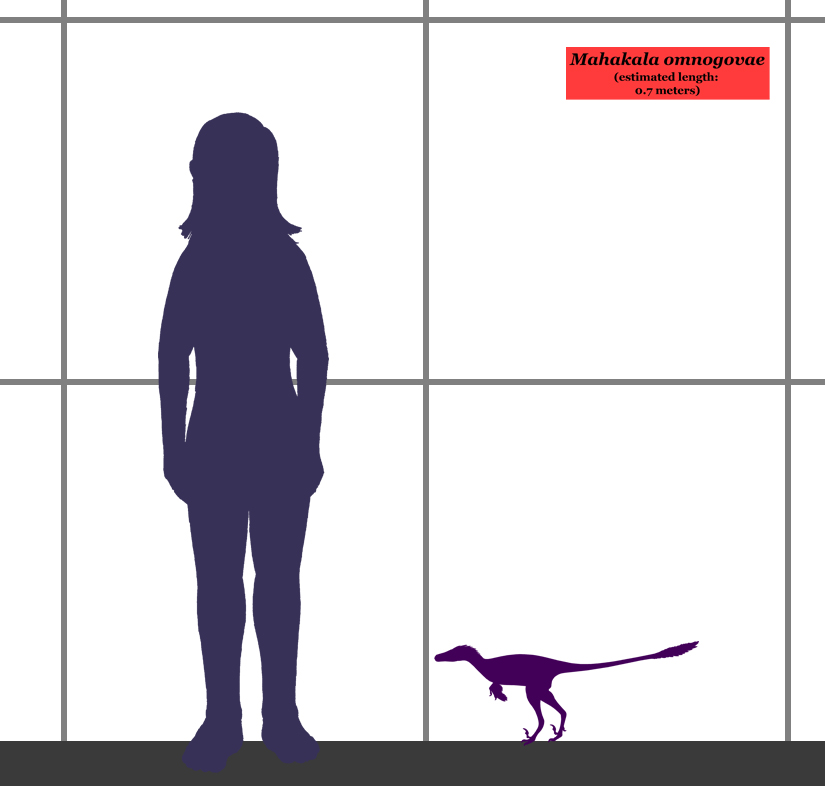
Size compared to a human, reconstructed as a generic deinonychosaur

Mahakala was a small dromaeosaurid, measuring 50–70 cm (20–28 in) long and weighing 400–700 g (14–25 oz). The holotype specimen, IGM 100/1033, consists of a partial skeleton including skull bones, vertebrae, limb bones, and portions of the pelvis and shoulder girdle. Although this individual was small, comparable in size to Archaeopteryx, Caudipteryx, and Mei, it was close to adulthood. This genus can be distinguished from other paravians (dromaeosaurids, troodontids, and birds) by details of the ulna, thighbone, ilium, and tail vertebrae. Like Archaeopteryx and derived dromaeosaurids, but unlike basal troodontids and other dromaeosaurids, the middle (third) metatarsal was not compressed, suggesting that the uncompressed version was the basal version. It had a typical dromaeosaurid form of the second toe, with an expanded claw.

== Classification ==
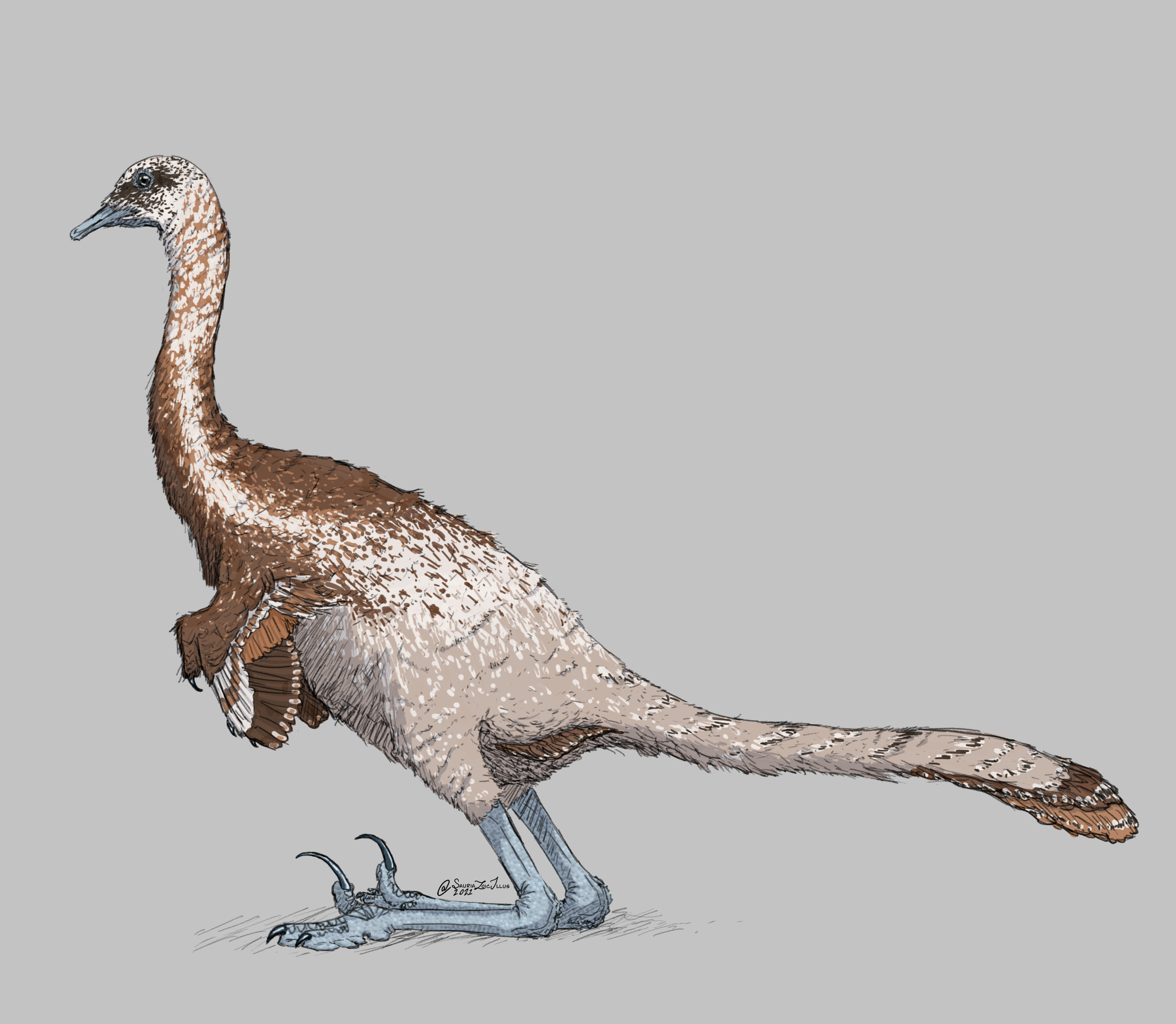
Artist's reconstruction of Mahakala as a halszkaraptorine

A phylogenetic analysis performed by Turner and colleagues, who described the specimen, found Mahakala to be the most basal known dromaeosaurid. Their results, along with the small size of other theropods found at the base of paravian lineages, suggest that small size was not an innovation of early birds, but a common trait of early paravians; small size would have preceded flight and would not have been a special avian autapomorphy as the result of a size squeeze. Like birds, troodontids and dromaeosaurids were not small throughout their evolutionary history, and showed size increases among several different lineages. Mahakala has a combination of characteristics found among basal troodontids and birds, but lacks some that are present in more derived dromaeosaurids. A study in 2017 found that Mahakala was a member of the enigmatic, basal subfamily Halszkaraptorinae.

The cladogram below is based on the phylogenetic analysis conducted in 2017 by Cau et al. using updated data from the Theropod Working Group in their description of Halszkaraptor.

- Dromaeosauridae
  - - Halszkaraptorinae
      - Halszkaraptor
      - - Mahakala
        - Hulsanpes
    - - - Unenlagiinae
          - Austroraptor
          - - Buitreraptor
            - Neuquenraptor
            - Unenlagia comahuensis
            - Unenlagia paynemili
      - - Shanag
        - - Zhenyuanlong
          - - - Microraptoria
                - Changyuraptor
                - NGMC 91
                - Graciliraptor
                - Microraptor
                - Sinornithosaurus
                - Hesperonychus
              - - Eudromaeosauria
                  - Bambiraptor
                  - - Tianyuraptor
                    - - - Dromaeosaurinae
                          - Achillobator
                          - - Utahraptor
                            - Dromaeosaurus
                      - Velociraptorinae
                        - Adasaurus
                        - - - Deinonychus
                            - Saurornitholestes
                          - - Velociraptor
                            - - Tsaagan
                              - Linheraptor

In 2020, Mahakala was recovered in a polytomy with halszkaraptorines, unenlagiines and microraptorines outside the subfamily. However, other more recent analyses still support the Halszkaraptorine placement of Mahakala.

== Paleoecology and paleobiology ==
The paleoenvironment of the Djadokhta Formation is interpreted as having a semiarid climate, with sand dune and alluvial settings. The semiarid steppe landscape was drained by intermittent streams and was sometimes affected by dust and sandstorms, and moisture was seasonal. Animals present included terrestrial turtles and crocodilians, lizards, mammals, and a variety of dinosaurs; aquatic animals like fish were not present. The majority of the fauna was small to medium-sized. Small coelurosaurians are the most diverse dinosaurs, including fellow dromaeosaurid Velociraptor, troodontids Byronosaurus and Saurornithoides, oviraptorids Citipati, Khaan, and Oviraptor, and alvarezsaurids Kol and Shuvuuia; other dinosaurs present included ceratopsians Protoceratops and Udanoceratops, the hadrosaur Plesiohadros, and the ankylosaurid Pinacosaurus. Like other dromaeosaurids, Mahakala would have been a small active predaceous carnivore. Halszkaraptorinae are known to be strong swimmers, this suggests that Mahakala may too have been a strong swimmer like the other members of its family.

== See also ==
- Timeline of dromaeosaurid research
