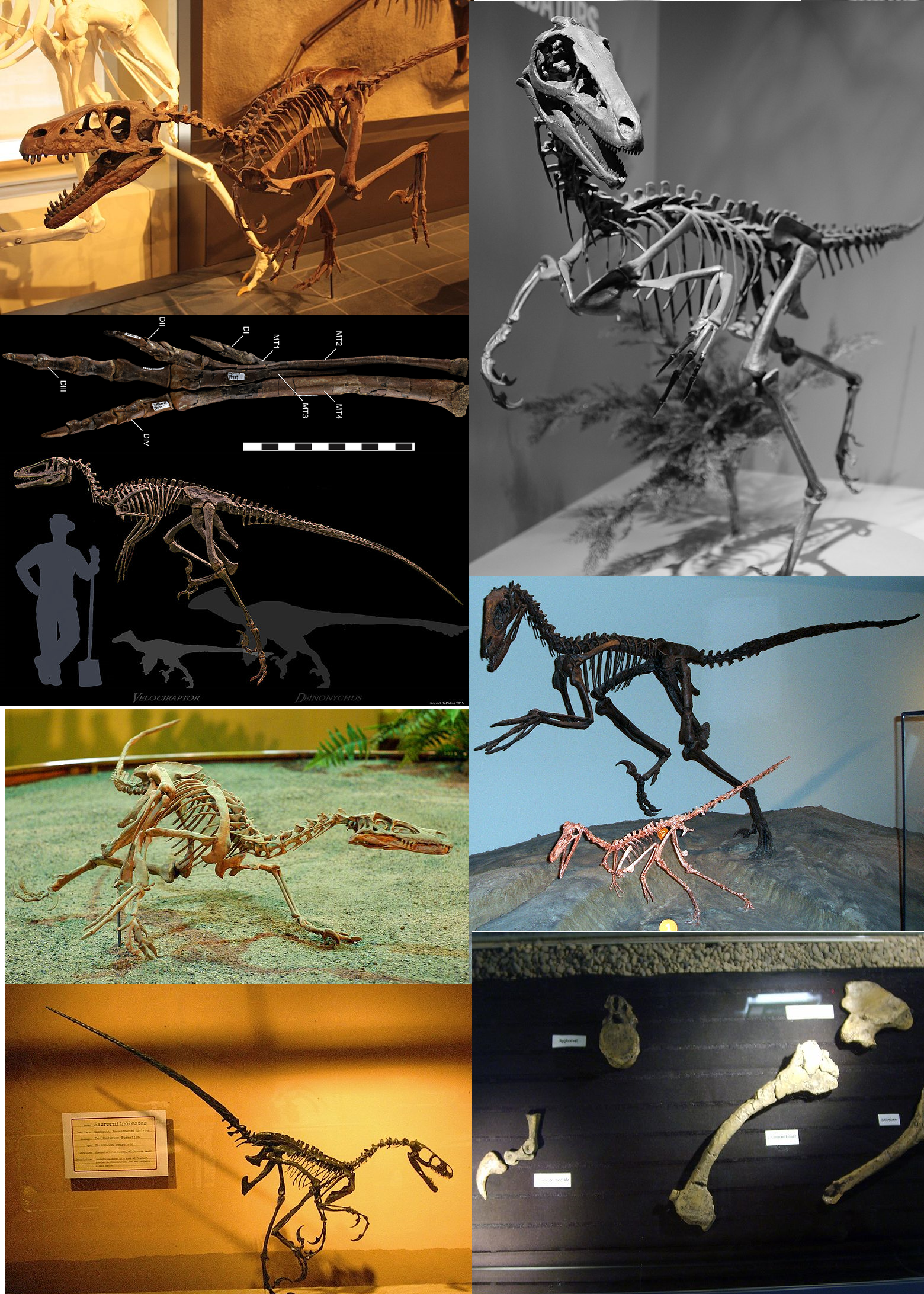
- Montage of putative deinonychosaurians

Scientific classification
- Kingdom: Animalia
- Phylum: Chordata
- Class: Reptilia
- Clade: Dinosauria
- Clade: Saurischia
- Clade: Theropoda
- Clade: Pennaraptora
- Clade: Paraves
- Clade: †Deinonychosauria; Colbert & Russell, 1969

Subclades
- †Archaeopterygidae? (including Anchiornithidae)?; †Unenlagiidae?; †Halszkaraptorinae?; †Unenlagiinae; †Troodontidae?; †Dromaeosauridae; †Microraptoria; †Eudromaeosauria

= Deinonychosauria =

Deinonychosaurs Temporal range: Middle Jurassic–Late Cretaceous, 167–66 Ma

Extinct clade of dinosaurs

Deinonychosauria is a clade of paravian dinosaurs that lived from the Late Jurassic to the Late Cretaceous periods. Fossils have been found across the globe in North America, Europe, Africa, Asia, South America, and Antarctica, with fossilized teeth giving credence to the possibility that they inhabited Australia as well. This group of dinosaurs are known for their sickle-shaped toe claws and features in the shoulder bones.

Deinonychosauria is commonly defined as all dinosaurs more closely related to dromaeosaurids (such as Deinonychus antirrhopus) than to birds (such as Passer domesticus). It traditionally includes the families Dromaeosauridae and Troodontidae, which each possess enlarged "sickle claws". Troodontids may instead be closer to birds than to dromaeosaurids, however, so they would lie outside Deinonychosauria under that hypothesis. This would also render Deinonychosauria equivalent to Dromaeosauridae, under a broad definition of the family. As the structure of the paravian family is still undergoing debate, the components of Deinonychosauria is unstable beyond dromaeosaurids.

== Systematics ==
In 1866 Ernst Haeckel created the now-deprecated subclass of birds known as Sauriurae (meaning "lizard tails" in Greek). It was intended to include Archaeopteryx and distinguish it from all other birds then known, which he grouped in the sister-group Ornithurae ("bird tails", from ornithes and ourai.). The distinction Haeckel referred to in this name is that Archaeopteryx possesses a long, reptile-like tail, while all other birds known to him had short tails with few vertebrae, fused at the end into a pygostyle. The unit was not much referred to, and when Hans Friedrich Gadow in 1893 erected Archaeornithes for basically the same fossils, this became the common name for the early reptile-like grade of birds. (The prefix "archaeo-" signifies in ancient Greek the "ancient.") This was followed by Alfred Romer (1933) and subsequent authors through most of the 20th century. According to Romer, the Archaeornithes are characterised by having clawed wings, a reptilian style ribcage without a large carina and the presence of a long, bony tail. The known members of the group by the time of its erection were Archaeopteryx and Archaeornis. The two are now thought to represent a single species, Archaeopteryx lithographica, the Archaeornis being the Berlin specimen of Archaeopteryx. It was in 1888 the German anatomist Max Fürbringer created the order Archaeopterygiformes, though the unit was not used as much as Archaeornithes. Due to the popularity of Archaeornithes as well as Archaeopterygidae being recognized as the only family in this clade, Sauriurae, Archaeornithes, and Archaeopterygiformes are considered to be redundant arbitrary names that can be synonymous.

During the dinosaur renaissance, the American palaeontologist John Ostrom had published a series of papers arguing that birds are highly derived dinosaurs, after undertaking comparisons between the then-newly discovered Deinonychus (from deinon & onyx denoting "terrible" & "nail") and Archaeopteryx (from archaeon & pteryx denoting "ancient" & "wing"), and noting their similarities in the wrist and shoulder bones. In his 1988 book Predatory Dinosaurs of the World, Gregory S. Paul classified dromaeosaurids in Archaeopterygidae. Paul states that:

Many theropods have been united into new groups... but the placement of Archaeopteryx and the sickle-clawed dromaeosaurs in the same family is by far the most radical–yet it is also one of the most necessary... how alike, in detail after detail, dromaeosaurs and Archaeopteryx were.

The name Deinonychosauria was coined by Ned Colbert and Dale Russell in 1969, and defined as a clade (all theropods closer to dromaeosaurids than to birds) by Jacques Gauthier in 1986. Through the early 2000s, the consensus among paleontologists was that dromaeosaurids were most closely related to the troodontids, and with the troodontids, deinonychosaurians were turned into the sister taxon to avialans, and therefore the closest relatives of avialan birds. In 2012, Turner et al. conducted a phylogenetic analysis (using a dataset of 474 characters scored for 111 taxa) that found Deinonychosauria to be monophyletic.

Nonetheless, several more recent studies have cast doubt on the hypothesis that dromaeosaurids and troodontids were more closely related to each other than either was to birds. A more robust 2013 study by Godefroit et al. (using a dataset of 1,500 characters scored for 358 taxa) found that troodontids were possibly more closely related to birds than to dromaeosaurids; forcing troodontids to remain in a monophyletic Deinonychosauria required four extra steps in the analysis, making this result less likely, but not implausible. Because Deinonychosauria was originally defined as all animals closer to dromaeosaurids than to birds without specific reference to troodontids, Deinonychosauria is a synonym of Dromaeosauridae if Troodontidae is closer to birds.

With the description in 2019 of the Late Jurassic genus Hesperornithoides, Hartman et al., using every named Mesozoic maniraptoromorph (with the addition of 28 unnamed specimens), which they scored 700 characters and 501 operational taxonomic units, found that most of the anchiornithids are members of Archaeopterygidae, Halszkaraptorinae and Unenlagiinae are in a redefined family Unenlagiidae, and a Dromaeosauridae sensu stricto is the sister taxon of Troodontidae. The authors opted for Deinonychosauria (defined as dinosaurs closer to Deinonychus antirrhopus than to Passer domesticus) over "Archaeopterygiformes".

- Deinonychosauria
  - Archaeopterygidae (including Anchiornithidae)
  - - Unenlagiidae (Halszkaraptorinae + Unenlagiinae)
    - - Dromaeosauridae (Microraptoria + Eudromaeosauria)
      - Troodontidae

In a study conducted in 2020, Archaeopteryx was recovered as an avialan.

== Description ==
Like other theropods, deinonychosaurs were bipedal; that is, they walked on their two hind legs. Whereas most theropods walked with three toes contacting the ground, fossilized footprint tracks confirm that most deinonychosaurs held the second toe off the ground in a hyperextended position, with only the third and fourth toes bearing the weight of the animal. This is called functional didactyly. The enlarged second toe bore an unusually large, curved sickle-shaped claw (held off the ground or 'retracted' when walking). This claw was especially large and flattened from side to side in the large-bodied predatory eudromaeosaurs. The first toe (hallux) was relatively small and angled inward toward the center of the body, but was not fully reversed as in modern birds.

The teeth of deinonychosaurs were curved and serrated, but not blade-like except in some advanced species such as Dromaeosaurus albertensis. The serrations on the front edge of deinonychosaur teeth were very small and fine, while the back edge had serrations that were very large and hooked. Deinonychosaurs generally had long, winged forelimbs, though these were smaller in some troodontids. The wings usually bore three large, flexible claws.

Most deinonychosaurs seem to have been predatory, though some smaller species especially among the troodontids are known to have been at least omnivorous.

== Claw function ==
One of the best-known features of deinonychosaurs is the presence of an enlarged and strongly curved "sickle claw" on a hyper-extendible second toe, modified to hold the sickle claw clear of the ground when walking. While this characteristic claw and its associated modifications to the anatomy of the foot (such as a shortened metatarsus in eudromaeosaurs) had been known since the mid-20th century, their possible functions were the subject mainly of speculation, and few actual studies were published. Initial speculation regarded the claws as slashing implements used to disembowel large prey. In this scenario, the shortened upper foot would serve as an anchor point for powerful tendons to improve kicking ability. Subsequent studies of the actual claw shape showed that the underside of the claw was only weakly keeled, however, and would not have been an effective cutting instrument. Instead, it appeared to be more of a hooking implement. Manning et al. suggested in 2006 that the claws were similar to crampons and were used for climbing, and in the case of larger species or individuals, climbing up the flanks of very large prey.

A larger study of deinonychosaur claw function, published in 2011 by Fowler and colleagues, concluded that the earlier study by Manning and colleagues was correct and that the "sickle claws" of deinonychosaurs would have been ineffective as cutting weapons. They compared the claw and overall foot anatomy of various deinonychosaurs with modern birds to shed light on their actual function. Fowler and colleagues showed that many modern predatory birds also have enlarged claws on the second toes. In modern raptors, these claws are used to help grip and hold prey of sizes smaller than or equal to the predator, while the birds use their body weight to pin their prey to the ground and eat it alive. Fowler and colleagues suggested that this behavior is entirely consistent with the anatomy of advanced deinonychosaurs like Deinonychus, which had slightly opposing first toes and strong tendons in the toes and foot. This makes it likely that advanced dromaeosaurids also used their claws to puncture and grip their prey to aid in pinning it to the ground, while using shallow wing beats and tail movements to stabilize themselves. Other lines of evidence for this behavior include teeth that had large, hooked serrations only on the back edge (useful in pulling flesh upward rather than slicing it) and large claws on the wings (for greater maneuvering of prey while mantling it with the wings).

In more primitive dromaeosaurids and in troodontids, the feet were not as specialized and the claws were not as large or as hooked. Additionally, the toe joints allowed more range of motion than the simple up-down movements of advanced dromaeosaurids. This makes it likely that these species specialized in smaller prey that could be pinned using only the inner toes, not requiring the feet to be as strong or sturdy.
