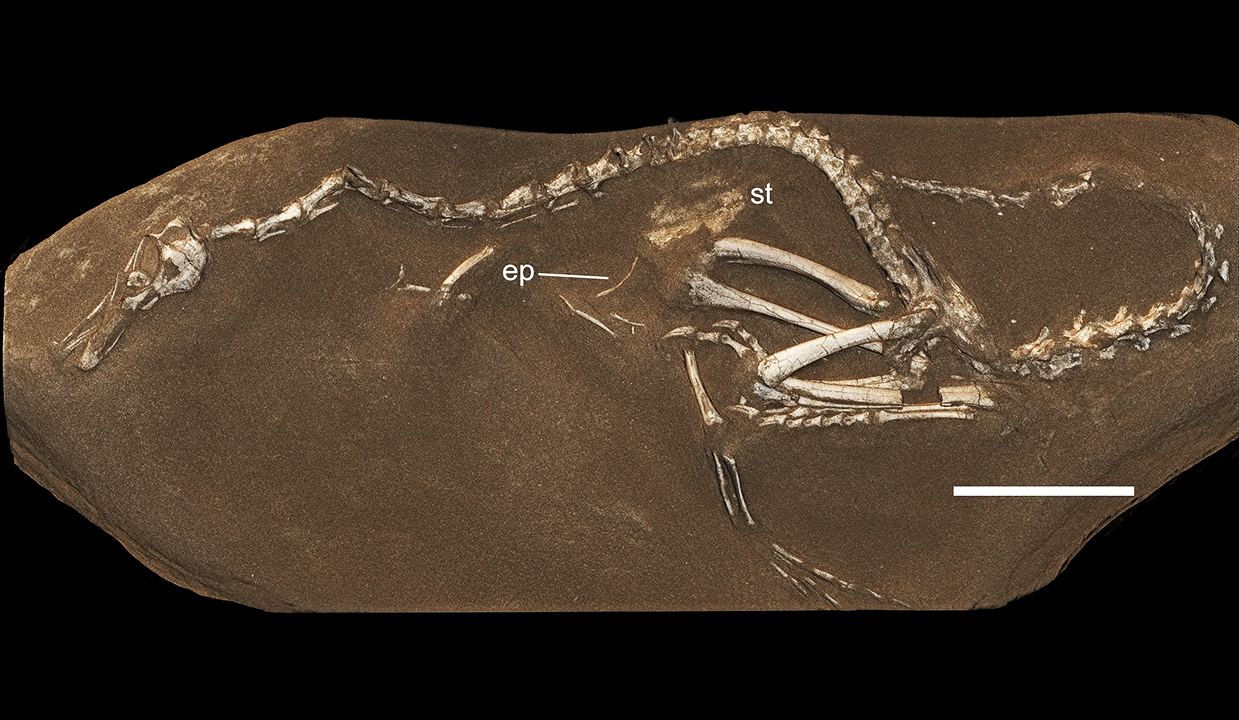
- Holotype specimen

Scientific classification
- Kingdom: Animalia
- Phylum: Chordata
- Class: Reptilia
- Clade: Dinosauria
- Clade: Saurischia
- Clade: Theropoda
- Clade: †Halszkaraptorinae
- Genus: †Halszkaraptor; Cau et al., 2017

Type species
- †Halszkaraptor escuilliei Cau et al., 2017

= Halszkaraptor =

Halszkaraptor Temporal range: Late Cretaceous (Campanian), 75–71 Ma

Extinct genus of dinosaurs

Halszkaraptor (/ˈhɑːlʃkəræptər/; meaning "Halszka's seizer") is a genus of waterfowl-like dromaeosaurid dinosaurs from Mongolia that lived during the Late Cretaceous period. It contains only one known species, Halszkaraptor escuilliei.

The type specimen (holotype) has been compared to the bones of extant crocodilians and aquatic birds, and displayed evidence of a semiaquatic lifestyle, while some researchers question a semiaquatic ecology. A phylogenetic analysis revealed it was a member of the basal subfamily Halszkaraptorinae, along with Mahakala and Hulsanpes.

== History of discovery ==
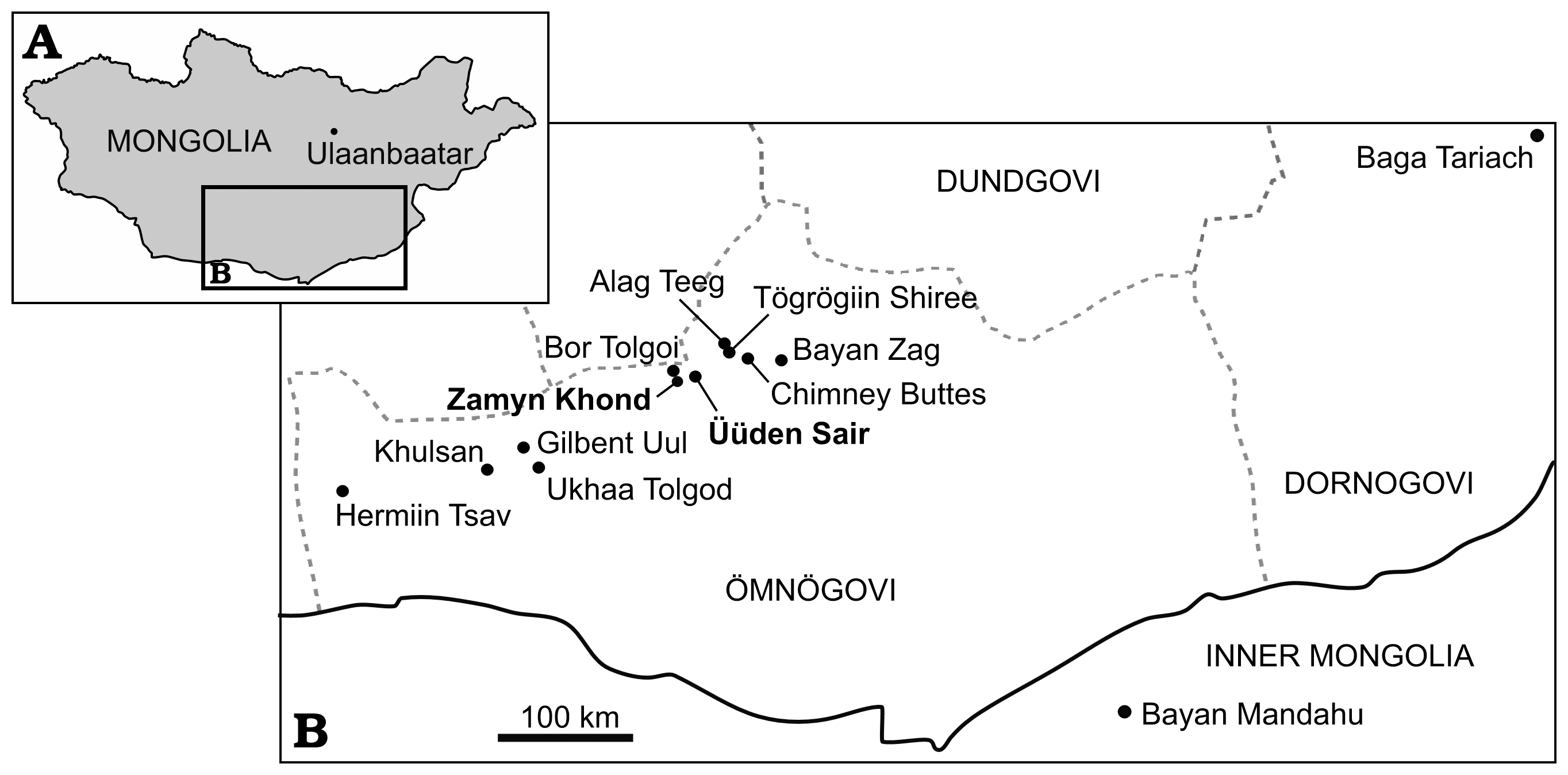
Cretaceous-aged dinosaur fossil localities of Mongolia; Halszkaraptor fossils have been collected at the Ukhaa Tolgod locality

The holotype specimen of Halszkaraptor likely came from the Djadochta Formation at Ukhaa Tolgod in southern Mongolia, and was illegally removed by fossil poachers in or before 2011. The fossil found its way to Japan and Great Britain, being owned by several collectors for some years until the Eldonia company of fossil dealer François Escuillié obtained it. He identified it as a new species, and in 2015 took it to the Royal Belgian Institute of Natural Sciences in Brussels, showing it to paleontologists Pascal Godefroit and Andrea Cau for further verification. After verifying its authenticity, among other means by scanning it with synchrotron radiation, a beam of X-rays, at the European Synchrotron Radiation Facility, Cau and other prominent paleontologists described the genus in a detailed study published in the journal Nature. The fossil was returned to the Mongolian authorities.

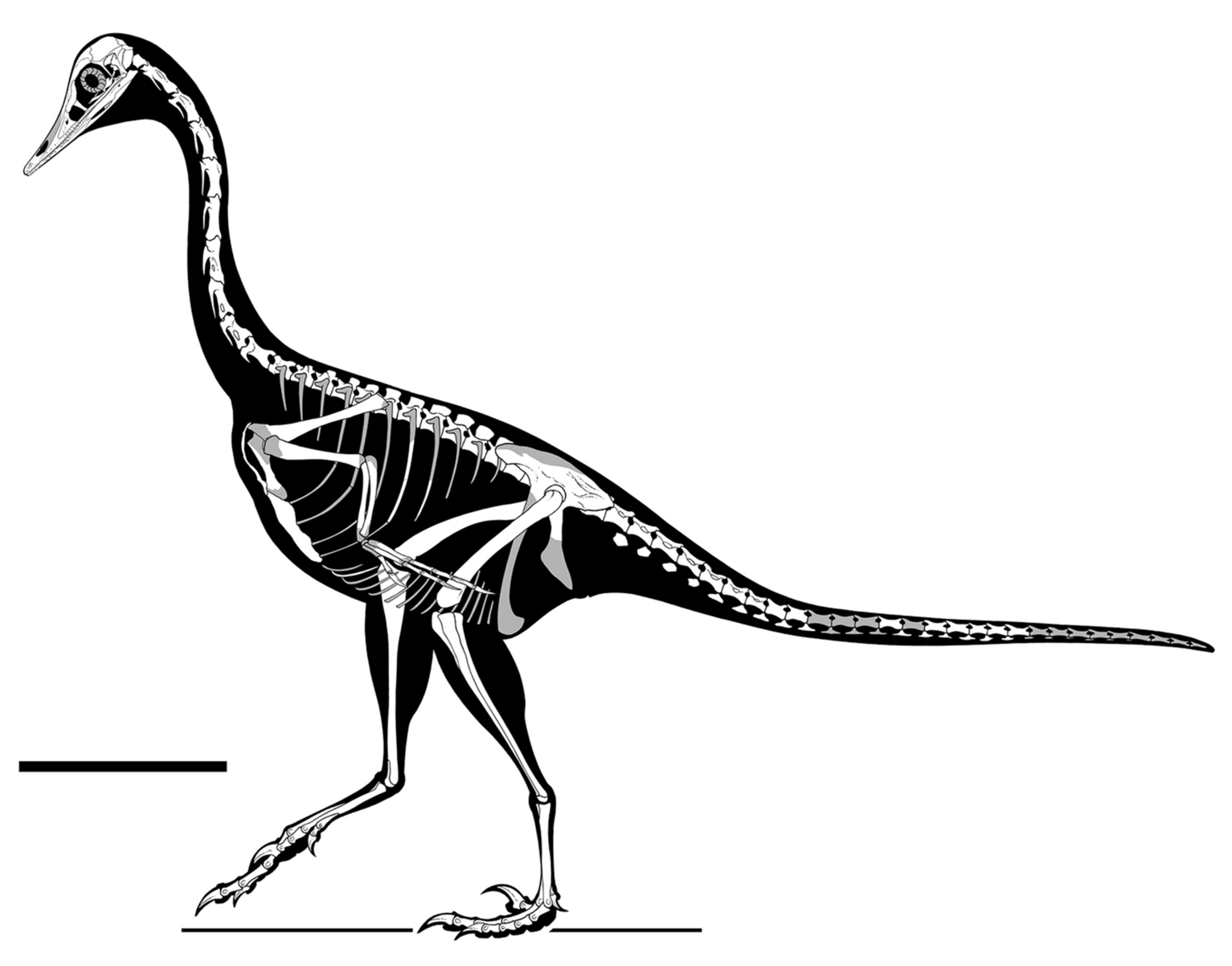
Skeletal diagram showing known remains. Scale bar equals 10 cm

The holotype, MPC D-102/109, was found in a layer of orange sandstone of the Bayn Dzak Member of the Djadochta Formation, dating from the late Campanian, about seventy-five million years old. It consists of a relatively complete skeleton with skull. In 2017, the fossil was not further prepared. Work by the fossil dealers had at that point generally exposed the left side of the skeleton. The synchrotron revealed that the bones continued into the rock and that the piece was probably not a chimaera, an artificial assembly of bones of disparate species, though the top of the snout had been restored with plaster and some elements had been reattached to the rock by glue. The skeleton is largely articulated and not compressed. It represents a subadult individual, about one year old.

The type species Halszkaraptor escuilliei was in 2017 named and described by Andrea Cau, Vincent Beyrand, Dennis F. A. E. Voeten, Vincent Fernandez, Paul Tafforeau, Koen Stein, Rinchen Barsbold, Khishigjav Tsogtbaatar, Philip John Currie, and Pascal Godefroit. The generic name combines a reference to the late Polish paleontologist Halszka Osmólska, who was involved in many expeditions to Mongolia and named the closely related Hulsanpes, with Latin raptor, "robber." The specific name honours Escuillié for having made the specimen available to science.

== Description ==
Size compared to a human

Halszkaraptor was about the size of a mallard duck. The head was about 7 cm (2.8 in) long, the neck 20 cm (7.9 in), the back 13 cm (5.1 in) and the sacrum 5 cm (2.0 in). The describing authors indicated some distinguishing traits. Some of these were autapomorphies, unique derived characters. The premaxilla, the front snout bone, forms a flattened snout, occupying 32% of the snout length. The premaxilla bears eleven teeth. The jugal bone is rod-shaped and its ascending branch occupies only a tenth of the bar behind the eye socket, not reaching the orbit. The neck is extremely elongated, representing half of the snout-sacrum length. The postzygapophyses, rear joint processes, of the neck vertebrae bear no epipophyses, additional processes on their upper rim. The neck vertebrae have extremely reduced neural spines: on the second to fifth vertebrae these are only low ridges and subsequent neck vertebrae lack them completely. In the second to fifth neck vertebrae the normally paired postzygapophyses have fused into a single lobe-shaped process. The neural spines of the tail vertebrae are extremely shortened: at the first three tail vertebrae they are formed like low bumps and subsequent tail vertebrae lack them completely. The chevrons of the tail base are large with a pentagonal profile. The first phalanx of the third finger has 47% of the length of the third metacarpal.

Furthermore, a unique combination is present of traits that in themselves are not unique. The external bony nostril is situated behind the main body of the premaxilla, the point where it connects to the front branch of the maxilla. The descending branch of the postorbital bone is rod-shaped. The number of vertebrae of the neck and back totals twenty-two. Only the seventh, eighth and ninth neck vertebrae have pleurocoels, pneumatic depressions on their sides. The transition between the tail base and the middle tail is situated at the seventh to eighth vertebra. The third finger is longer than the second finger.

=== Skull ===
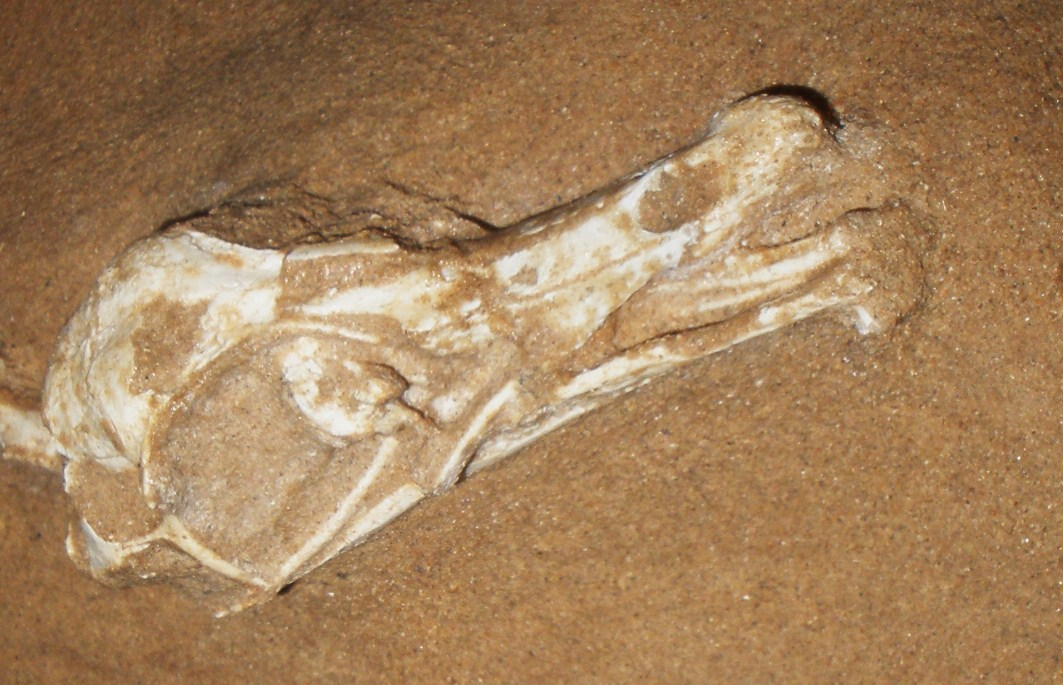
Skull of holotype MPC D-102/109

The snout, though elongated, is transversely expanded in front, creating a spoon-shaped profile in top view. It is also flat, and its width is 180% of its height. The top profile in side view is hollow. The expanded area consists of a relatively long premaxilla. This bone is internally excavated by a system of air chambers. From a larger chamber in the rear, neurovascular channels permeate the entire bone, not just the sides as in Neovenator, but the top also. These channels probably housed electro-sensory organs. Each premaxilla bears eleven teeth, a record among the entire Dinosauria. Theropods normally have four premaxillary teeth and the previous record for this group was seven, as found in spinosaurids. In Halskaraptor, the premaxillary teeth are very closely packed, touching each other, and are very elongated, gradually recurving. The teeth in the maxilla, estimated in number at twenty to twenty-five, are more robust, curve only at their tips, and are spaced at a larger distance. They are more transversely flattened, with an oval cross-section. The dentary of the lower jaw likewise bears an estimated twenty to twenty-five teeth. The nostrils are relatively retracted. They are also unique for a theropod in being obliquely oriented to the top in front view. Despite the length of the snout, the main opening in the side of the front skull, the antorbital fenestra, is short; shorter than high. The rear skull roof is vaulted.

=== Postcranial skeleton ===
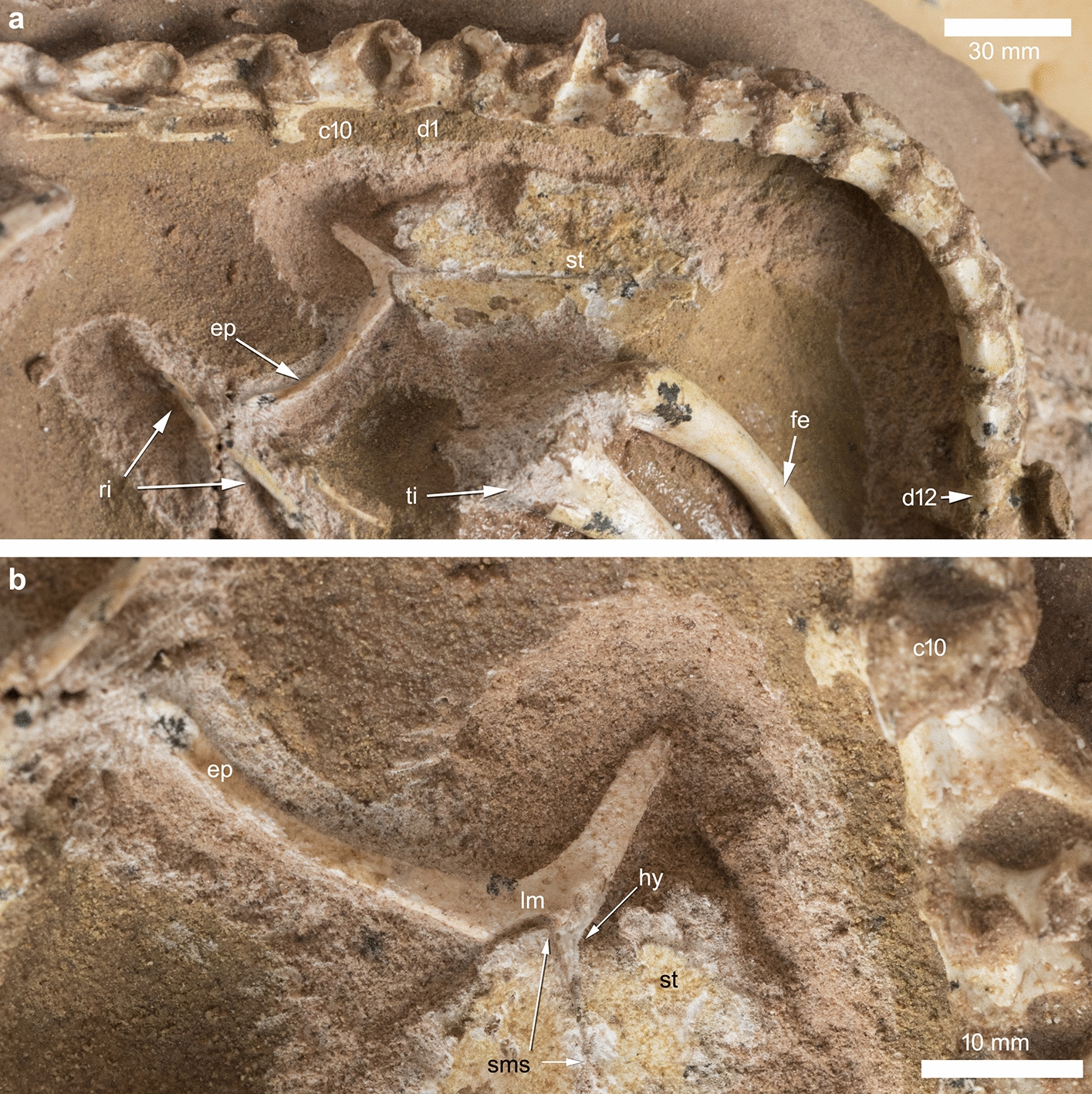
Pectoral area of holotype MPC D-102/109

The vertebral column of Halszkaraptor contains ten neck vertebrae, twelve back vertebrae and six sacral vertebrae. The preserved tail vertebrae include the first twenty caudals and a series of six from the middle tail. The neck is very elongated. It equals 290% of the skull length and 150% of the back length. This implies that it represents half of the snout-sacrum length, a value that is the highest for all known Mesozoic paravians. Within the Paraves, only some more recent birds have a proportionally longer neck. Among more basal theropods only some oviraptorosaurs approach this value; even ornithomimosaurs never surpass 40%. The length is not caused by a greater number of vertebrae, as in the Oviraptorosauria, but by an elongation of the individual vertebrae. The sixth cervical vertebra is the longest, being four times longer than tall. The neck vertebrae generally have a simplified structure, as exemplified by the lack of rear epipophyses. Most are not pneumatised by pleurocoels, depressions in which diverticula of air sacs penetrate the bone walls.

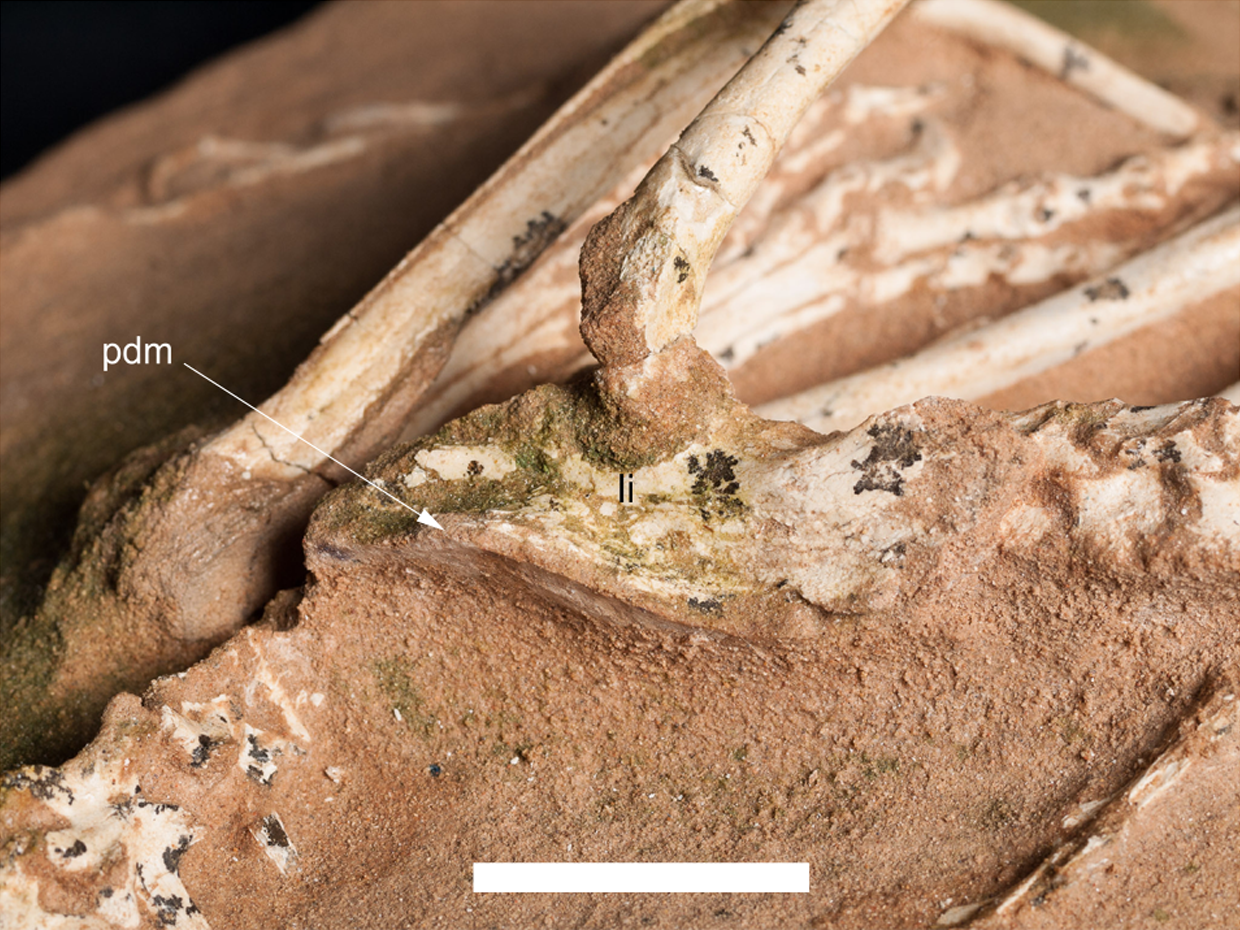
Pelvis area of holotype MPC D-102/109

On the front neck, the neural spines, normally rectangular plates, have been reduced to a low ridge; more to behind they have disappeared. At the first five neck vertebrae, the postzygapophyses have no separating space in between them but are fused into a single lobe. With other basal maniraptoriforms these rear joint processes are sometimes connected by a plate, but in that case the bony shelf is notched by a postspinal fossa causing a concave profile in top view; in Halszkaraptor this groove is absent and the profile is convex. The neck ribs are short, no longer than the vertebral bodies. The back vertebrae are not pneumatised. The tail is not stiffened by long zygapophyses or chevrons as in derived eudromaeosaurs. The tail base is rather short in that the transition point to the middle tail, where the transverse processes cease to exist, is at the eighth vertebra. The transition is also very gradual in morphology. The neural spines of the front tail are already strongly reduced: only the first three vertebrae possess them and they are formed like low bumps.

== Classification ==
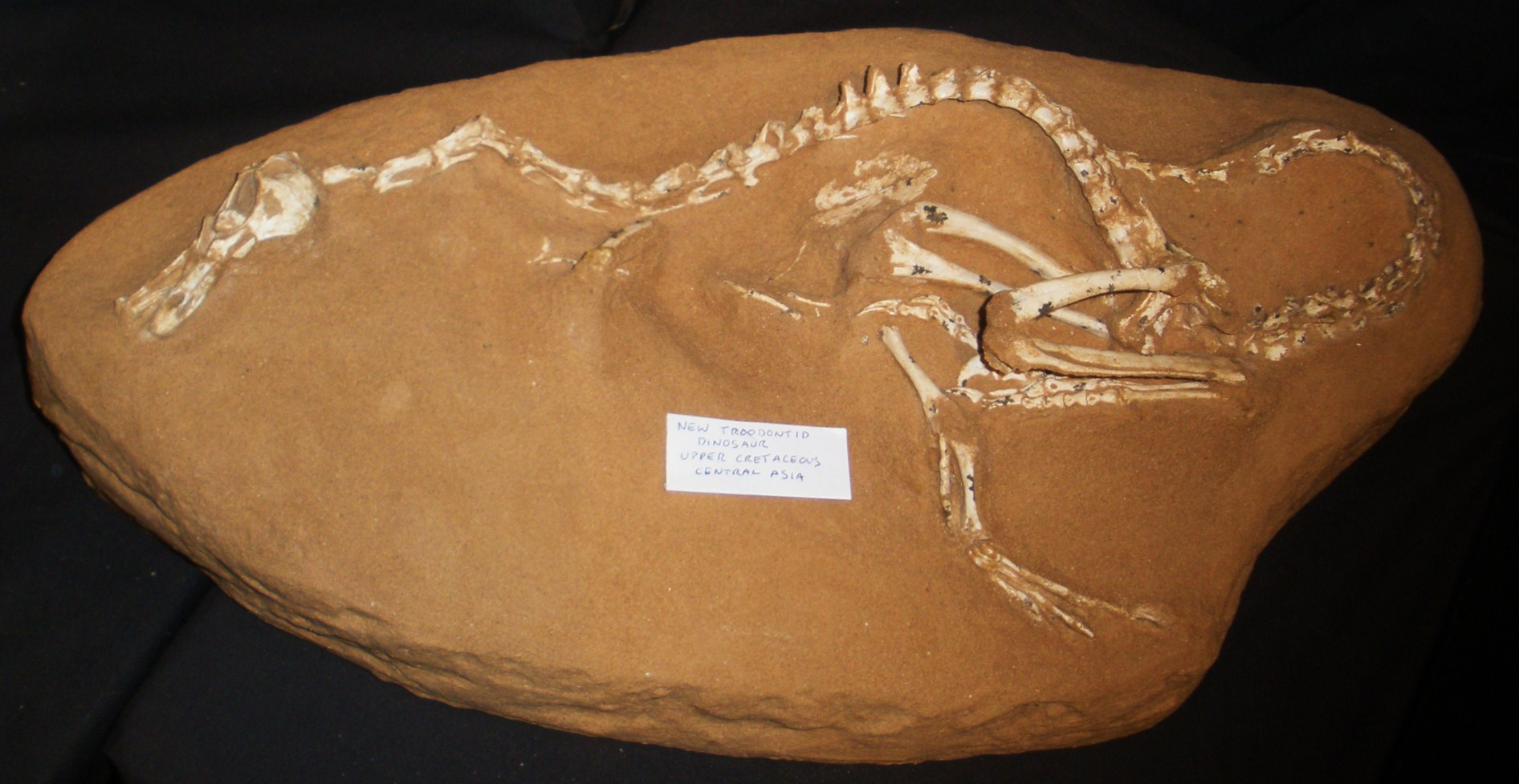
Photo of the holotype at Munich Fossil Show in 2011 before the genus was named, labelled as a troodontid and with two rib fragments that are now lost

Halszkaraptor was placed in the Dromaeosauridae in 2017. A new clade Halszkaraptorinae was coined, containing Halszkaraptor and its close relatives Hulsanpes and Mahakala. The cladogram below is based on the phylogenetic analysis conducted in 2017 by Cau et al. using updated data from the Theropod Working Group. The analysis showed that Halszkaraptorinae was the basalmost known dromaeosaurid group. Halszkaraptor occupied a basal position within Halszkaraptorinae, as the sister group of a clade formed by Hulsanpes and Mahakala.

- Dromaeosauridae
  - Halszkaraptorinae
    - Halszkaraptor
    - - Mahakala
      - Hulsanpes
  - - Unenlagiinae
    - - Shanag
      - - Zhenyuanlong
        - - Microraptoria
          - - Bambiraptor
            - - Tianyuraptor
              - Eudromaeosauria
                - Dromaeosaurinae
                - Velociraptorinae

== Paleobiology ==
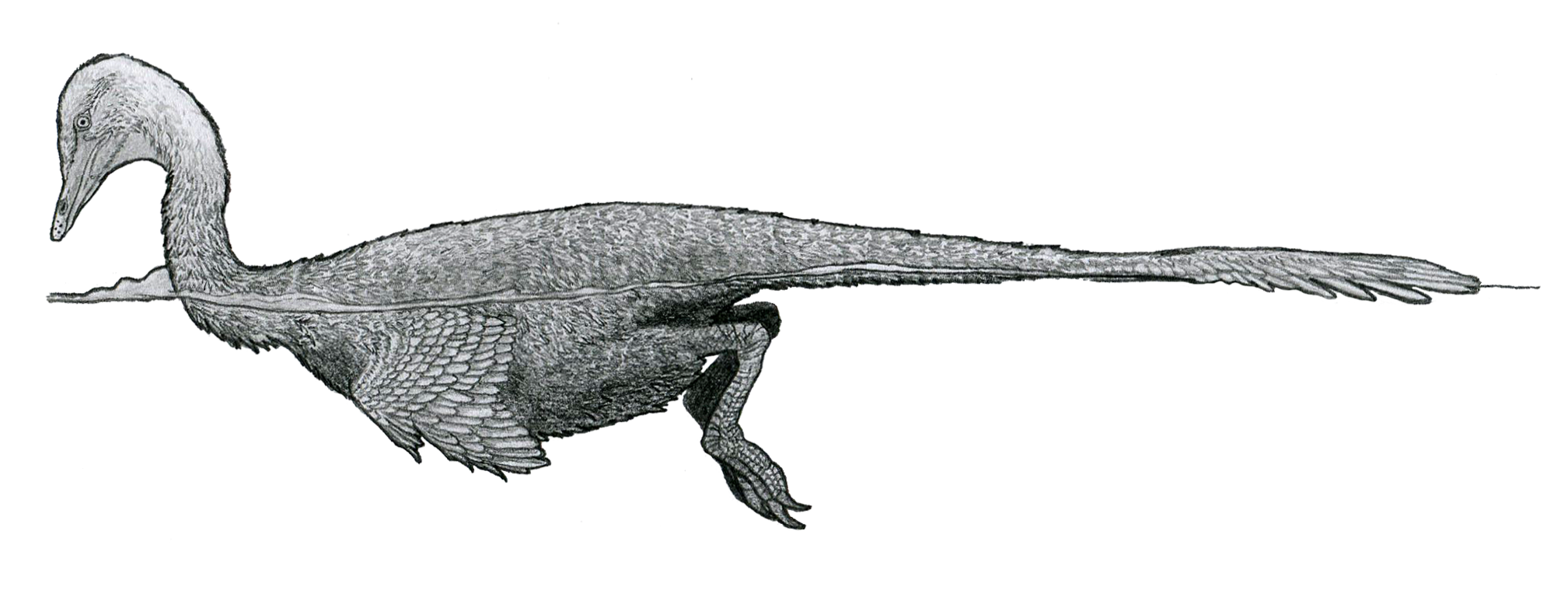
Reconstruction of Halszkaraptor escuilliei, with plumage and swimming posture based on aquatic birds that use wing-propelled swimming

Andrea Cau argues that Halszkaraptor had characteristics that allowed it to spend time both in water and on land, including strong hindlimbs for running and smaller flipper-like forelimbs for swimming. The short tail would have brought the centre of gravity more to the front, which is more useful for swimming than walking. The torso would have been held more vertical than is normal with theropods. To this end, there are adaptations for an improved extension of the hindlimb, in the hip joint and the thighbone. It had many sharp, backward-curving teeth in its mouth, a long neck and sensory neurons in its snout that may have allowed it to detect vibrations in water, leading scientists to believe that it hunted aquatic prey. It had to come up onto land to reproduce, because, like all dinosaurs, it needed to lay its eggs on land. A more recent analysis performed by Cau specifically points out similarities to modern-day mergansers. He stated that these birds are probably the closest ecological analogs to Halszkaraptor as they share similar traits with this dromaeosaurid taxon, such as the long neck and a serrated snout edge used to catch small prey. While they are less active moving on land, assuming a hip-extended body posture, on water, they use a distinct swimming model including forelimb-propelled locomotion. This particular behaviour has also been inferred for Halszkaraptor, and seems to support a piscivorous and aquatic life-style similar to that of mergansers.

Other researchers have either disagreed with or merely followed Cau's interpretation. In 2019, Brownstein argued that the features noted for Halszkaraptor do not directly support its ability to swim. He also suggested that this dinosaur may be a basal dromaeosaur with transitional features, although Cau rebutted his claims a year later. In 2021, Hone and Holtz noted that the absence of flattened unguals on Halszkaraptor does not preclude the ability to swim, as some modern swimming birds such as loons also lack flattened unguals, while the wading flamingos possess them. They wrote that earlier research had concluded Halszkaraptor was a wing-propelled swimmer but did not propose their own view on this dinosaur's potential ability to swim. In 2022, Fabbri and his colleagues argued against a semi-aquatic ecology for Halszkaraptor, noting that it had low bone density, a trait not observed in semi-aquatic animals. In response, Cau has pointed out on his blog that swans similarly have low bone density yet have adaptations for semi-aquatic feeding. A 2024 study by Tse, Miller, and Pittman, focusing on the skull morphology and bite forces of various dromaeosaurids discovered that Halszkaraptor had a rapid bite unsuited to piscivorous feeding as previously hypothesized based on its skull morphology, and instead suggest it was an "invertivore", a specialist of small aquatic invertebrates that may have hunted in poor visibility (at night or in murky water), since it likely had exceptional low-light vision among dromaeosaurids based on its relatively large orbit size.

== See also ==
- Timeline of dromaeosaurid research
