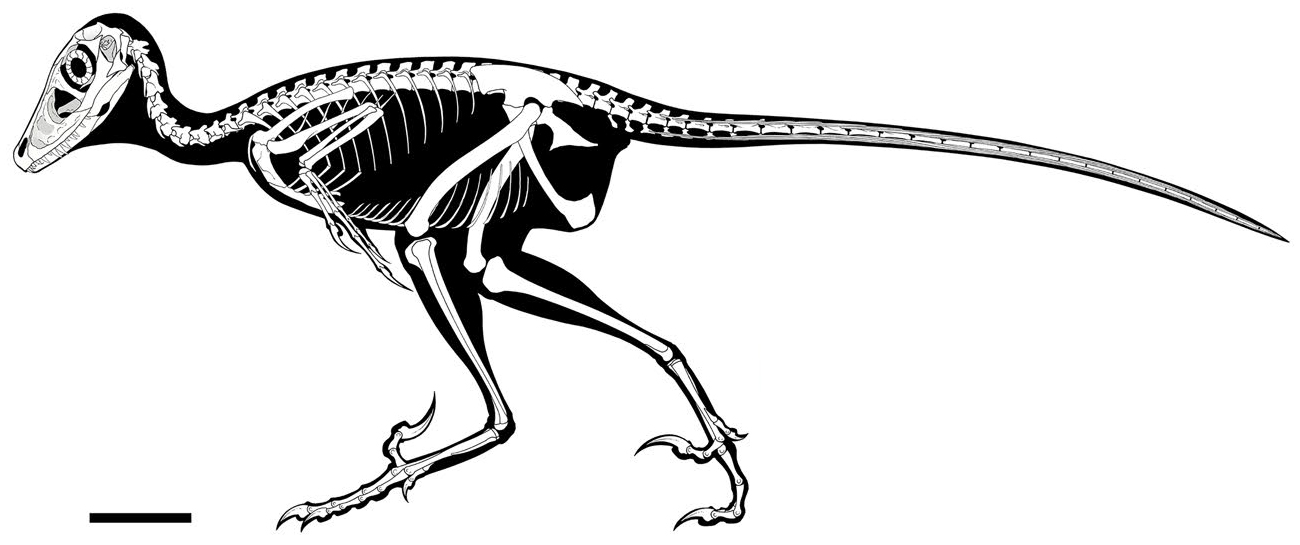
- Skeletal reconstruction of Daurlong

Scientific classification
- Kingdom: Animalia
- Phylum: Chordata
- Class: Reptilia
- Clade: Dinosauria
- Clade: Saurischia
- Clade: Theropoda
- Family: †Dromaeosauridae
- Genus: †Daurlong; Wang et al., 2022
- Species: †D. wangi

Binomial name
- †Daurlong wangi Wang et al., 2022

= Daurlong =

Daurlong Temporal range: Early Cretaceous (Aptian), ~121.23 Ma

Genus of dromaeosaurid dinosaurs

Daurlong (meaning "Daur dragon") is an extinct genus of dromaeosaurid dinosaur from the Lower Cretaceous (Aptian) Longjiang Formation of China. The genus contains a single species, D. wangi, known from a nearly complete skeleton. Daurlong represents the first described occurrence of a preserved intestinal region in a theropod closely related to birds.

== Discovery and naming ==
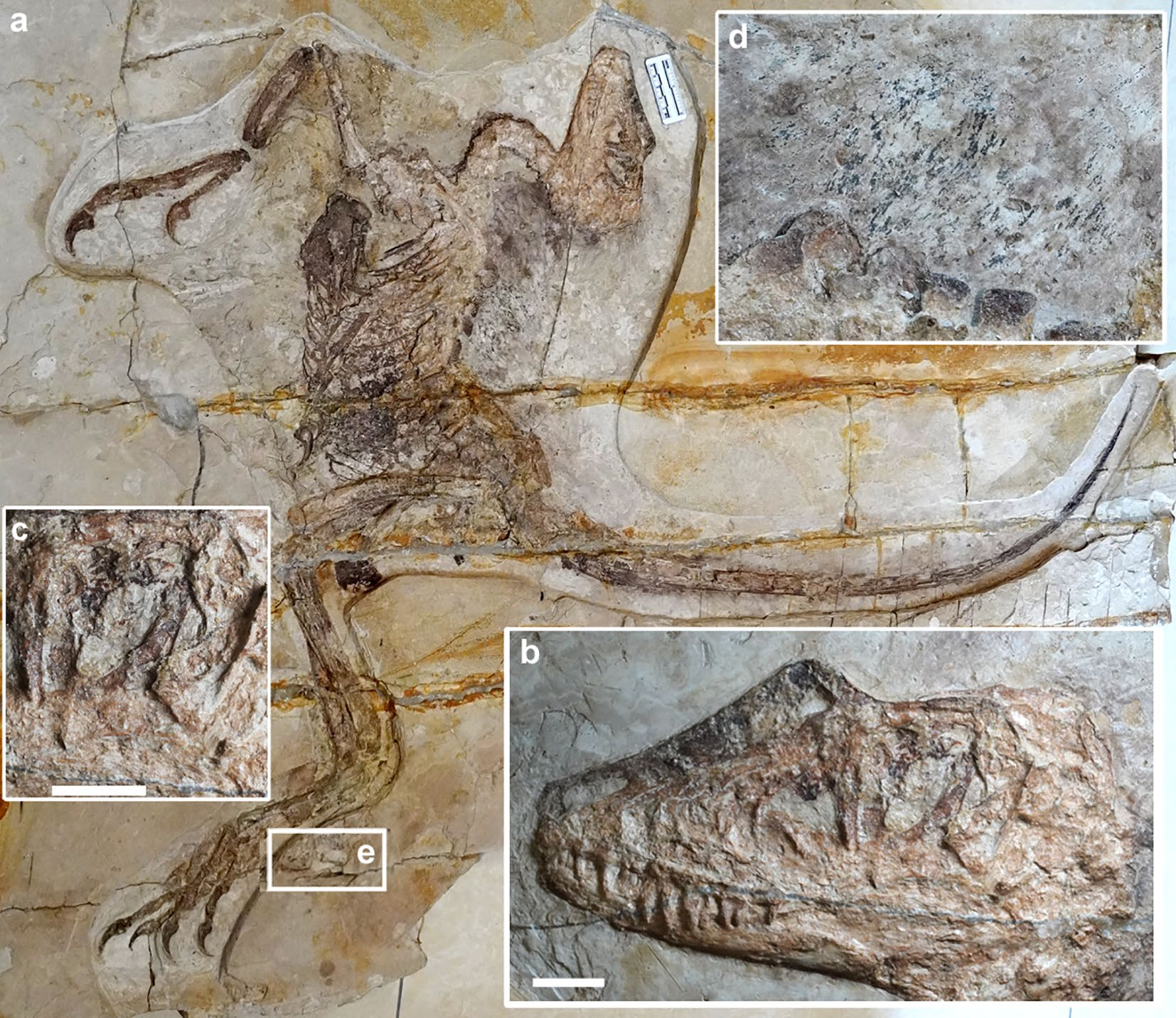
Holotype of Daurlong

Daurlong type locality in Inner Mongolia, China

The Daurlong holotype specimen, IMMNH-PV00731, was found in sediments of the Longjiang Formation (Pigeon Hill locality) of Morin Dawa Daur Autonomous Banner, Inner Mongolia, China. This locality is dated to the Aptian age of the Early Cretaceous period. It consists of a nearly complete specimen of an individual, including a near-perfectly articulated skull. A partial anuran skeleton was also preserved on the holotype slab.

In 2022, Daurlong wangi was described as a new genus and species of dromaeosaurid theropod dinosaurs by Xuri Wang, Andrea Cau, Bin Guo, Feimin Ma, Gele Qing, and Yichuan Liu based on these remains. The generic name, "Daurlong", combines a reference to the Daur Nation with the Chinese "龙" ("lóng"), meaning "dragon." The specific name, "wangi", honors Wang Junyou, the director of the Inner Mongolia Museum of Natural History.

== Description ==
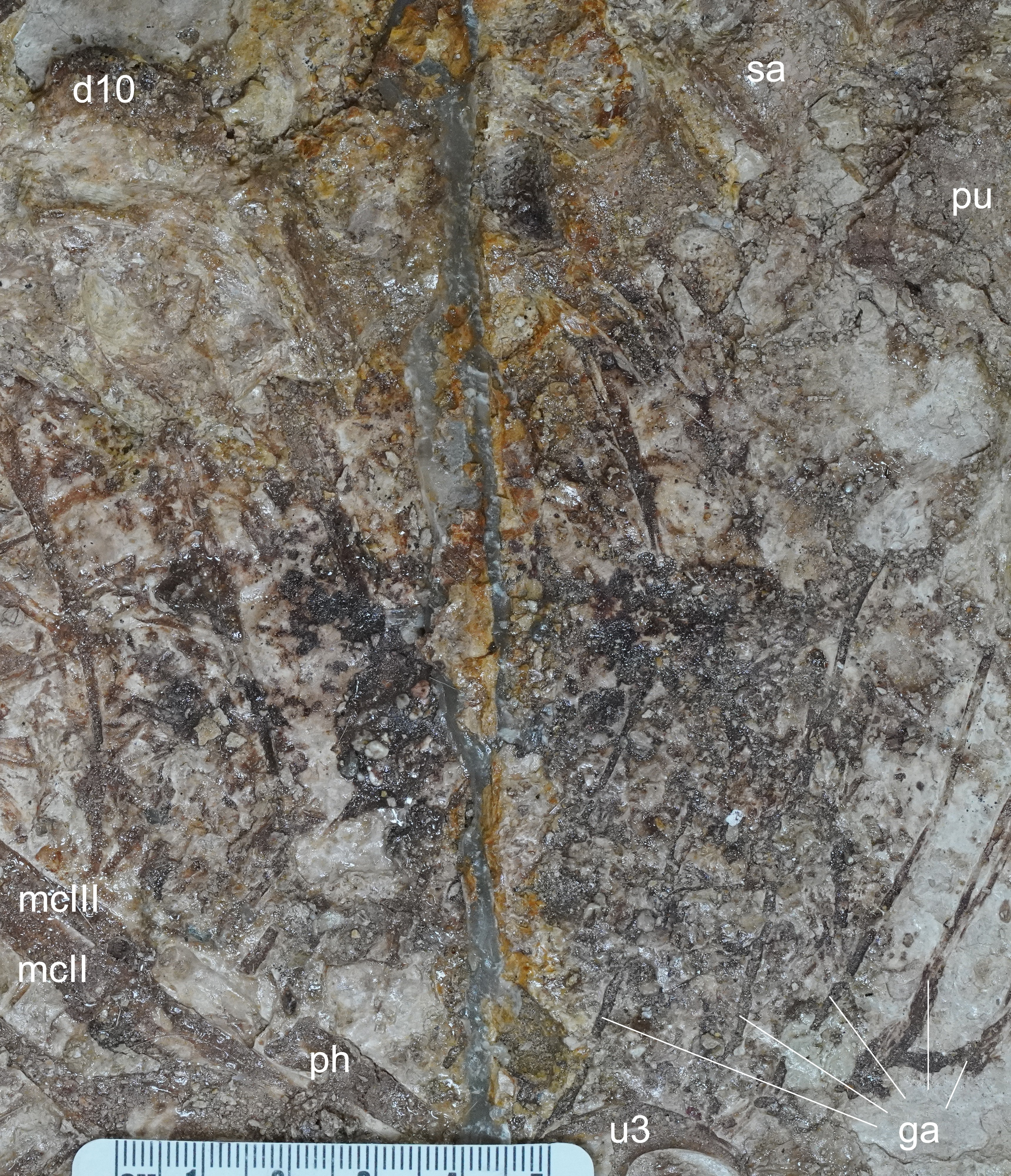
Daurlong holotype abdominal region

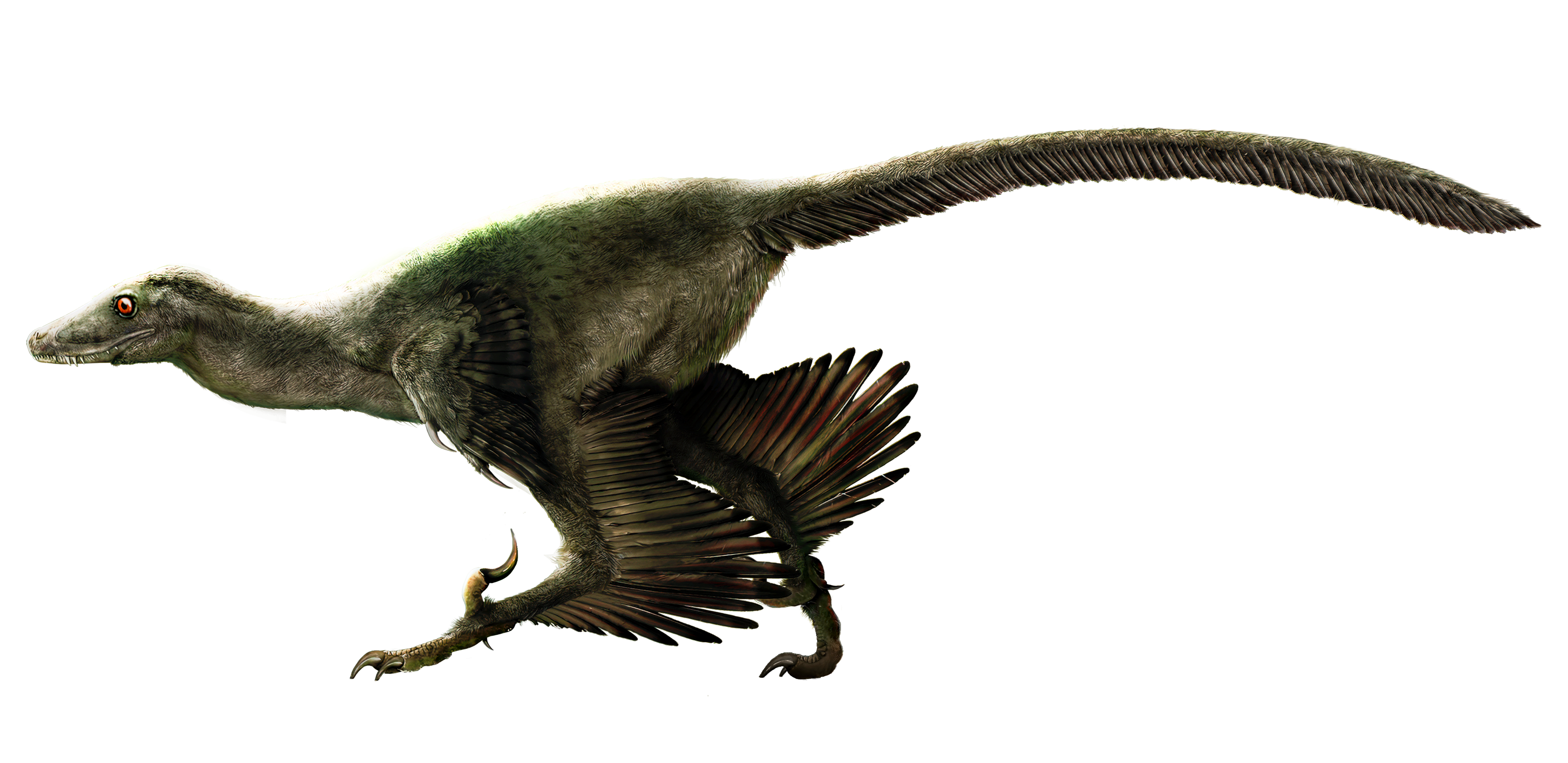
Life reconstruction

Daurlong was a mid-sized dromaeosaurid, about 1.5 m (4.9 ft) long. The preserved specimen is 85% the size of the Tianyuraptor holotype, and 93% the size of the Zhenyuanlong holotype. The skull is about 94% the length of the femur, and the forelimbs are less than 60% of the length of the hindlimbs. The specimen preserves plumage along the back of the skull and neck, and the edges of the tail. The fossil does not include pennaceous remiges and rectrices, as in Zhenyuanlong. A bluish layer preserved in the Daurlong specimen ribcage matches the intestinal tract seen in the Scipionyx holotype.

== Classification ==
In their phylogenetic analyses, Wang et al. (2022) recovered Daurlong as a member of the Dromaeosauridae, in a clade containing Tianyuraptor and Zhenyuanlong. The cladogram below displays the results of their phylogenetic analyses.

- Dromaeosauridae
  - - Halszkaraptorinae
    - Unenlagiinae
  - - Microraptorinae
    - - Shanag
      - - - Tianyuraptor
          - - Daurlong
            - Zhenyuanlong
        - - Eudromaeosauria
