= List of non-avian dinosaur species preserved with evidence of feathers =

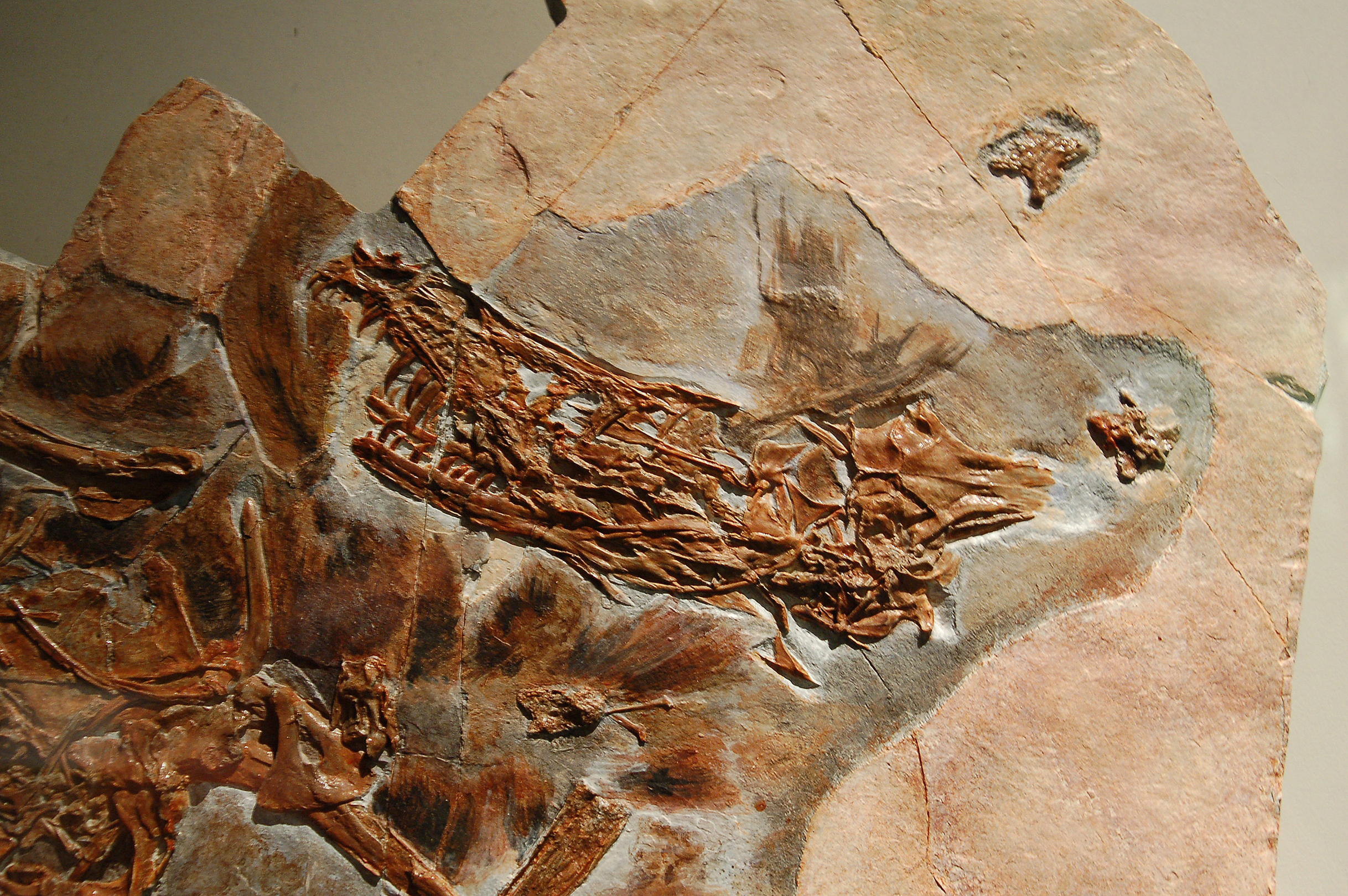
Fossil of Sinornithosaurus millenii, the first evidence of feathers in dromaeosaurids

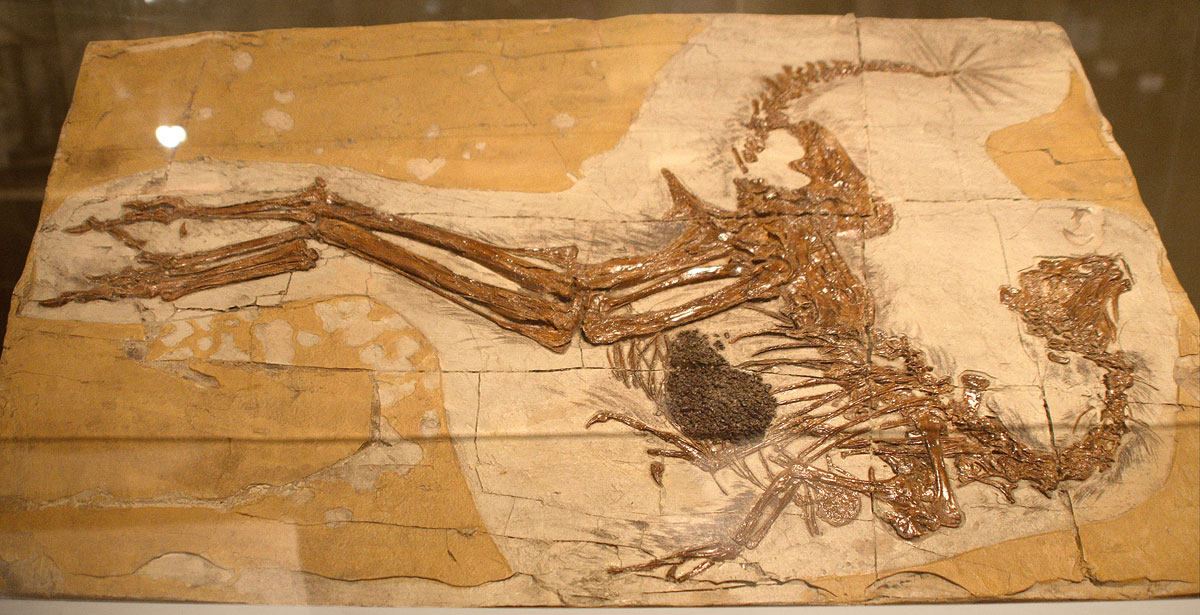
Cast of a Caudipteryx fossil with feather impressions and stomach content

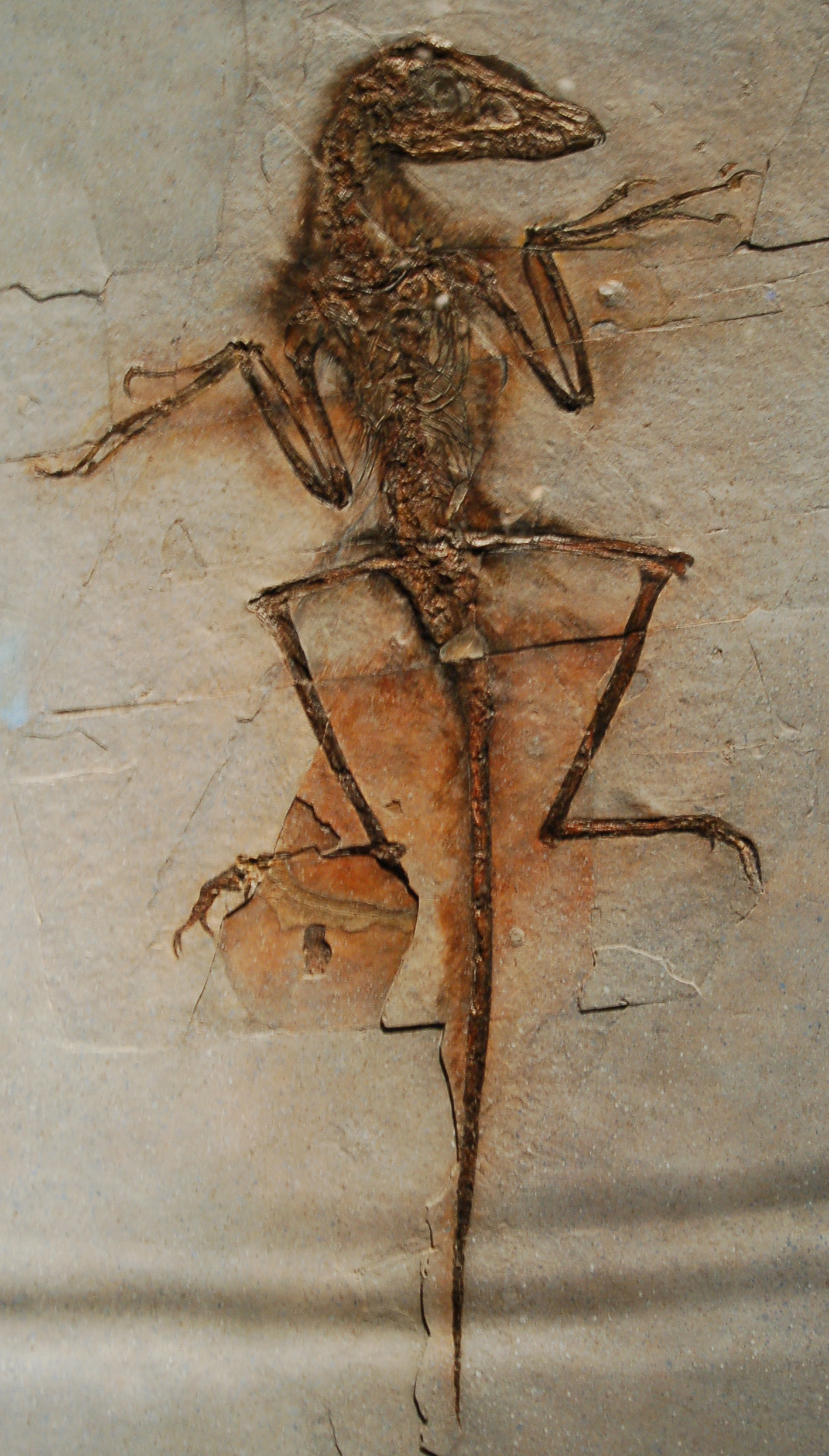
Fossil cast of a Sinornithosaurus millenii

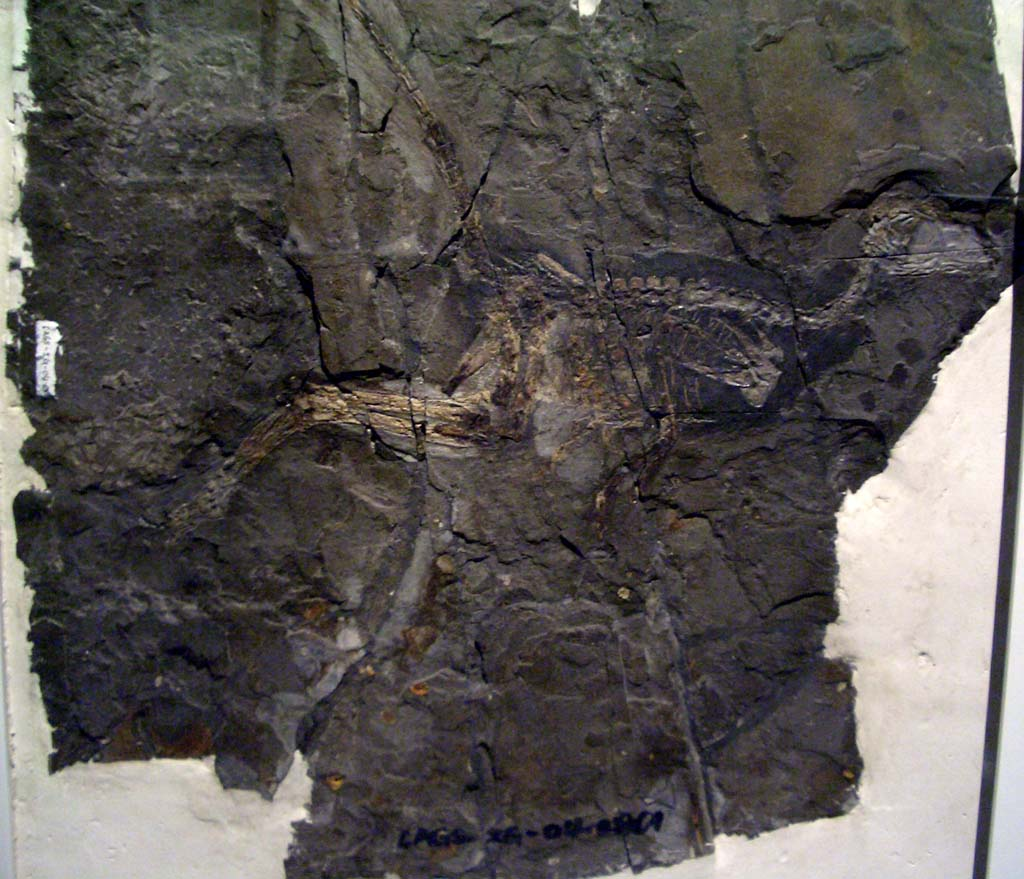
Jinfengopteryx elegans fossil

Many non-avian dinosaurs were feathered. Direct evidence of feathers exists for the following species, listed in the order currently accepted evidence was first published. In all examples, the evidence described consists of feather impressions, except those genera inferred to have had feathers based on skeletal or chemical evidence, such as the presence of quill knobs (the anchor points for wing feathers on the forelimb) or a pygostyle (the fused vertebrae at the tail tip which often supports large feathers).

1. Archaeopteryx lithographica (1861; possibly avialan)
2. Ostromia crassipes (1970; possibly avialan)
3. Avimimus portentosus (inferred 1987: ulnar ridge)
4. Sinosauropteryx prima (1996)
5. Fulicopus lyellii, an ichnotaxon, possible squatting Dilophosaurus or similar (1996)
6. Protarchaeopteryx robusta (1997)
7. GMV 2124 (1997)
8. Caudipteryx zoui (1998)
9. Rahonavis ostromi (inferred 1998: quill knobs; possibly avialan)
10. Shuvuuia deserti (1999)
11. Beipiaosaurus inexpectus (1999)
12. Sinornithosaurus millenii (1999)
13. Caudipteryx dongi (2000)
14. Caudipteryx sp. (2000)
15. Microraptor zhaoianus (2000)
16. Nomingia gobiensis (inferred 2000: pygostyle)
17. Psittacosaurus sp.? (2002)
18. Scansoriopteryx heilmanni (2002; possibly avialan)
19. IVPP V13476 (2003)
20. Yixianosaurus longimanus (2003; possibly avialan)
21. Dilong paradoxus (2004)
22. Pedopenna daohugouensis (2005; possibly avialan)
23. Jinfengopteryx elegans (2005)
24. Juravenator starki (2006)
25. Sinocalliopteryx gigas (2007)
26. Velociraptor mongoliensis (inferred 2007: quill knobs)
27. Epidexipteryx hui (2008; possibly avialan)
28. Similicaudipteryx yixianensis (inferred 2008: pygostyle)
29. Anchiornis huxleyi (2009; possibly avialan)
30. Tianyulong confuciusi? (2009)
31. Incisivosaurus sp. (2010)
32. Concavenator corcovatus? (inferred 2010: quill knobs?)
33. Xiaotingia zhengi (2011; possibly avialan)
34. Yutyrannus huali (2012)
35. Sciurumimus albersdoerferi (2012)
36. Ornithomimus edmontonicus (2012)
37. Ningyuansaurus wangi (2012)
38. Eosinopteryx brevipenna (2013; possibly avialan)
39. Jianchangosaurus yixianensis (2013)
40. Aurornis xui (2013; possibly avialan)
41. Changyuraptor yangi (2014)
42. Kulindadromeus zabaikalicus? (2014)
43. Citipati osmolskae (inferred 2014: pygostyle)
44. Conchoraptor gracilis (inferred 2014: pygostyle)
45. Deinocheirus mirificus (inferred 2014: pygostyle)
46. Yi qi (2015; possibly avialan)
47. Ornithomimus sp. (2015)
48. Zhenyuanlong suni (2015)
49. Dakotaraptor steini (inferred 2015: quill knobs)
50. Apatoraptor pennatus (inferred 2016: quill knobs)
51. DIP-V-15103 (2016; possibly avialan)
52. Jianianhualong tengi (2017)
53. Serikornis sungei (2017; possibly avialan)
54. Caihong juji (2018; possibly avialan)
55. Xingtianosaurus ganqi (2019)
56. Ambopteryx longibrachium (2019; possibly avialan)
57. Wulong bohaiensis (2020)
58. Chirostenotes pergracilis? (2020)
59. Dineobellator notohesperus (inferred 2020: quill knobs)
60. Daurlong wangi (2022)
61. Sinosauropteryx lingyuanensis (2025)
62. Huadanosaurus sinensis (2025)
63. Changzhousaurus sinensis (2026)
64. Norellraptor barsboldi (2026)
- Note that the filamentous structures in some ornithischian dinosaurs (Psittacosaurus, Tianyulong and Kulindadromeus) and the pycnofibres found in some pterosaurs may or may not be homologous with the feathers of theropods.
