= Feathered dinosaur =

Dinosaur with feathers

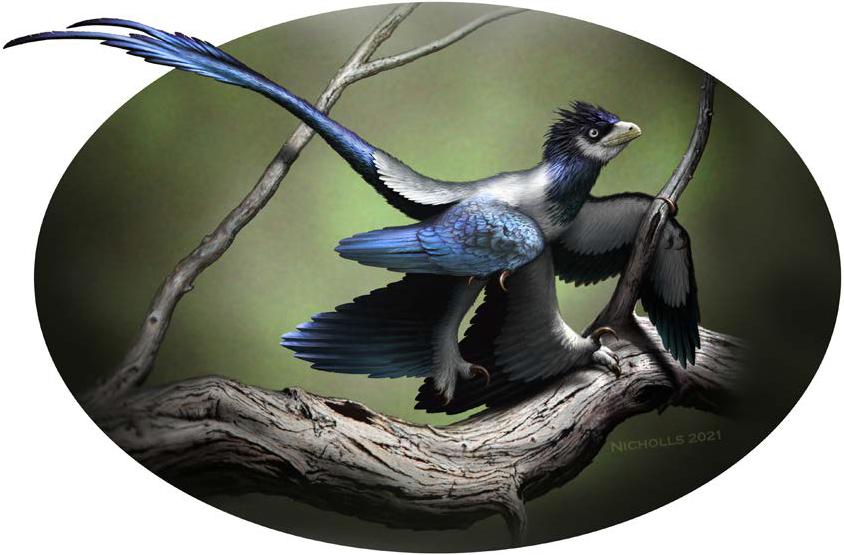
Life restoration of the feathered Wulong with colors inferred from preserved melanosomes

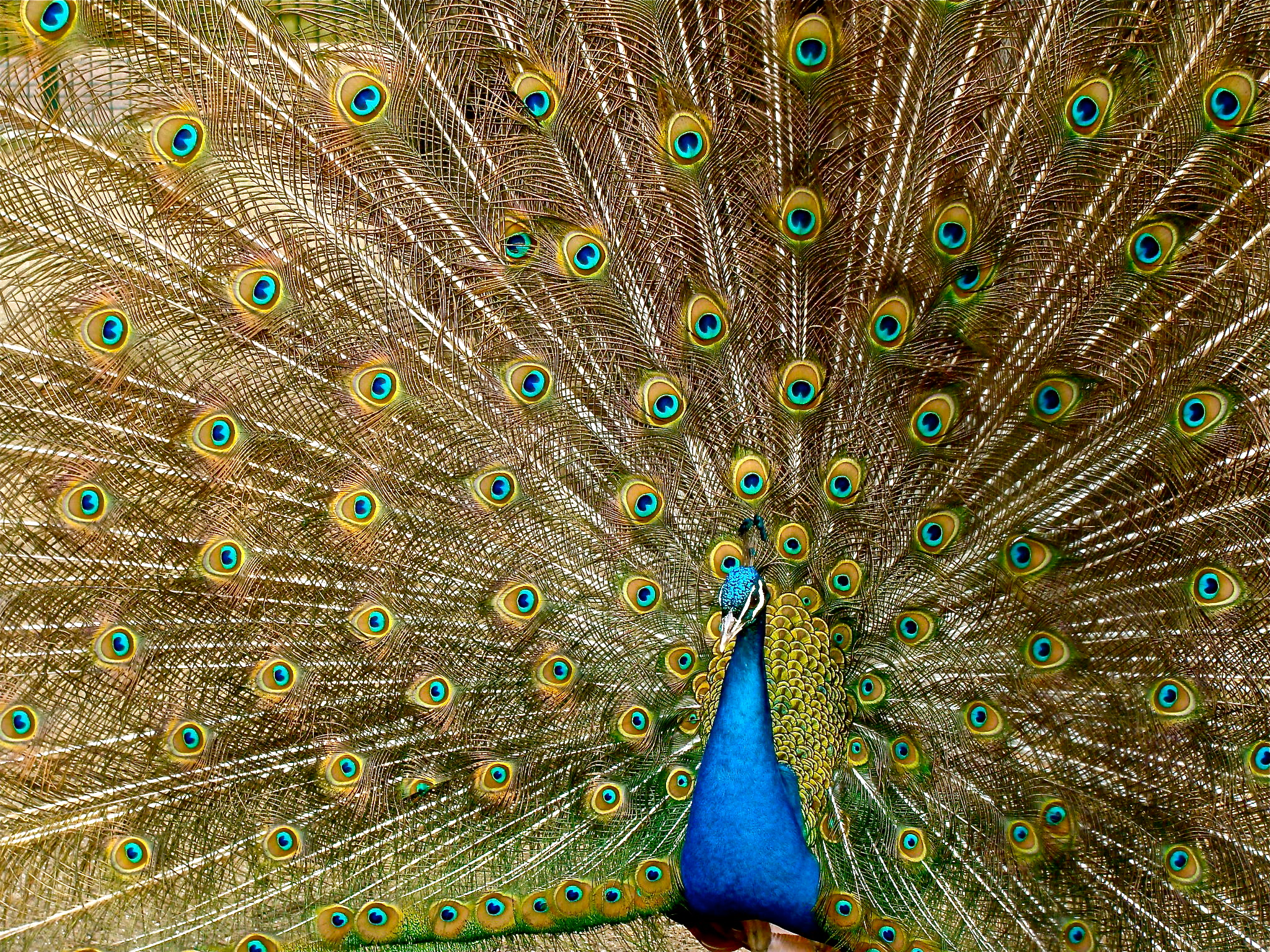
Birds are the best-known feathered dinosaurs

A feathered dinosaur is any species of dinosaur possessing feathers, including all species of birds. In recent decades, evidence has accumulated that many non-avian dinosaur species also possessed feathers or feather-like structures in some shape or form. The extent to which feathers or feather-like structures were present in dinosaurs as a whole is a subject of ongoing debate and research.

It has been suggested that feathers had originally functioned as thermal insulation, as it remains their function in the down feathers of infant birds prior to their eventual modification in birds into structures that support flight.

Since scientific research began on dinosaurs in the early 1800s, they were generally thought to be closely related to modern reptiles such as lizards. The word dinosaur itself, coined in 1842 by paleontologist Richard Owen, comes from the Greek for 'terrible lizard'. That view began to shift during the so-called dinosaur renaissance in scientific research in the late 1960s; by the mid-1990s, significant evidence had emerged that dinosaurs were much more closely related to birds, which descended directly from an earlier group of theropod dinosaurs.

Knowledge of the origin of feathers developed as new fossils were discovered throughout the 2000s and the 2010s, and technology enabled scientists to study fossils more closely. Among non-avian dinosaurs, feathers or feather-like integument have been discovered in dozens of genera via direct and indirect fossil evidence. Although the vast majority of feather discoveries have been in coelurosaurian theropods, feather-like integument has also been discovered in at least three ornithischians, suggesting that feathers may have been present on the last common ancestor of the Ornithoscelida, a dinosaur group including both theropods and ornithischians. It is possible that feathers first developed in even earlier archosaurs, in light of the discovery of vaned feathers in pterosaurs. Fossil feathers from the dinosaur Sinosauropteryx contain traces of beta-proteins (formerly called beta-keratins), confirming that early feathers had a composition similar to that of feathers in modern birds. Crocodilians also possess beta keratin similar to those of birds, which suggests that they evolved from common ancestral genes.

== History of research ==
=== Early ===
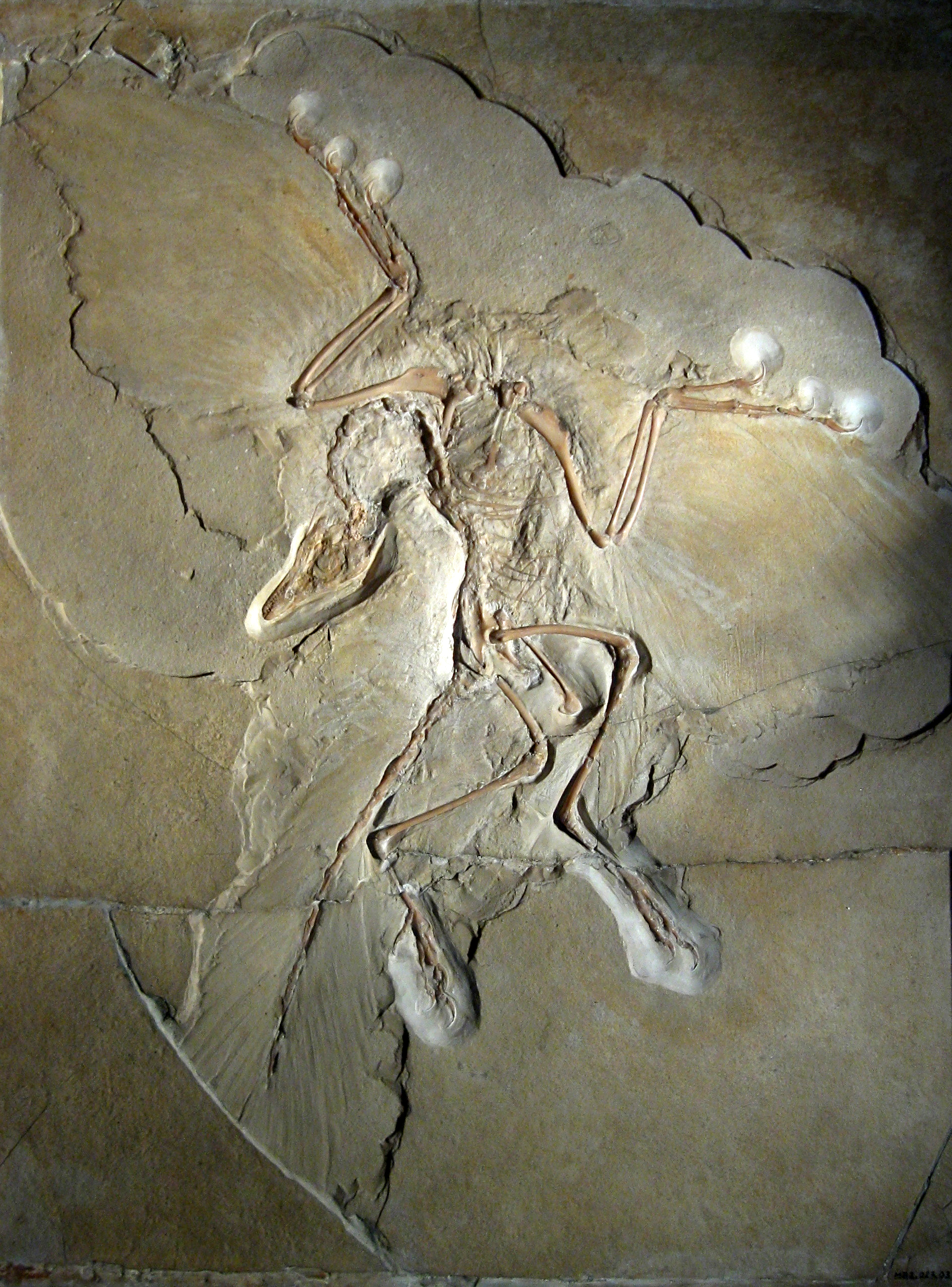
The Berlin Archaeopteryx

Shortly after the 1859 publication of Charles Darwin's On the Origin of Species, the British biologist Thomas Henry Huxley proposed that birds were descendants of dinosaurs. He compared the skeletal structure of Compsognathus, a small theropod dinosaur, and the "first bird" Archaeopteryx lithographica (both of which were found in the Upper Jurassic Bavarian limestone of Solnhofen). He showed that, apart from its hands and feathers, Archaeopteryx was quite similar to Compsognathus. Thus Archaeopteryx represents a transitional fossil. In 1868, he published On the Animals which are most nearly intermediate between Birds and Reptiles, which made that case.

The first restoration of a feathered dinosaur was Huxley's depiction in 1876 of a feathered Compsognathus, made to accompany a bird evolution lecture he delivered in New York, in which he speculated that the aforementioned dinosaur might have had feathers.

=== Dinosaur renaissance ===
A century later, during the dinosaur renaissance, paleoartists began to create modern restorations of highly active dinosaurs. In 1969, Robert T. Bakker drew a running Deinonychus. His student Gregory S. Paul depicted non-avian maniraptoran dinosaurs with feathers and protofeathers, starting in the late 1970s.

=== Fossil discoveries ===
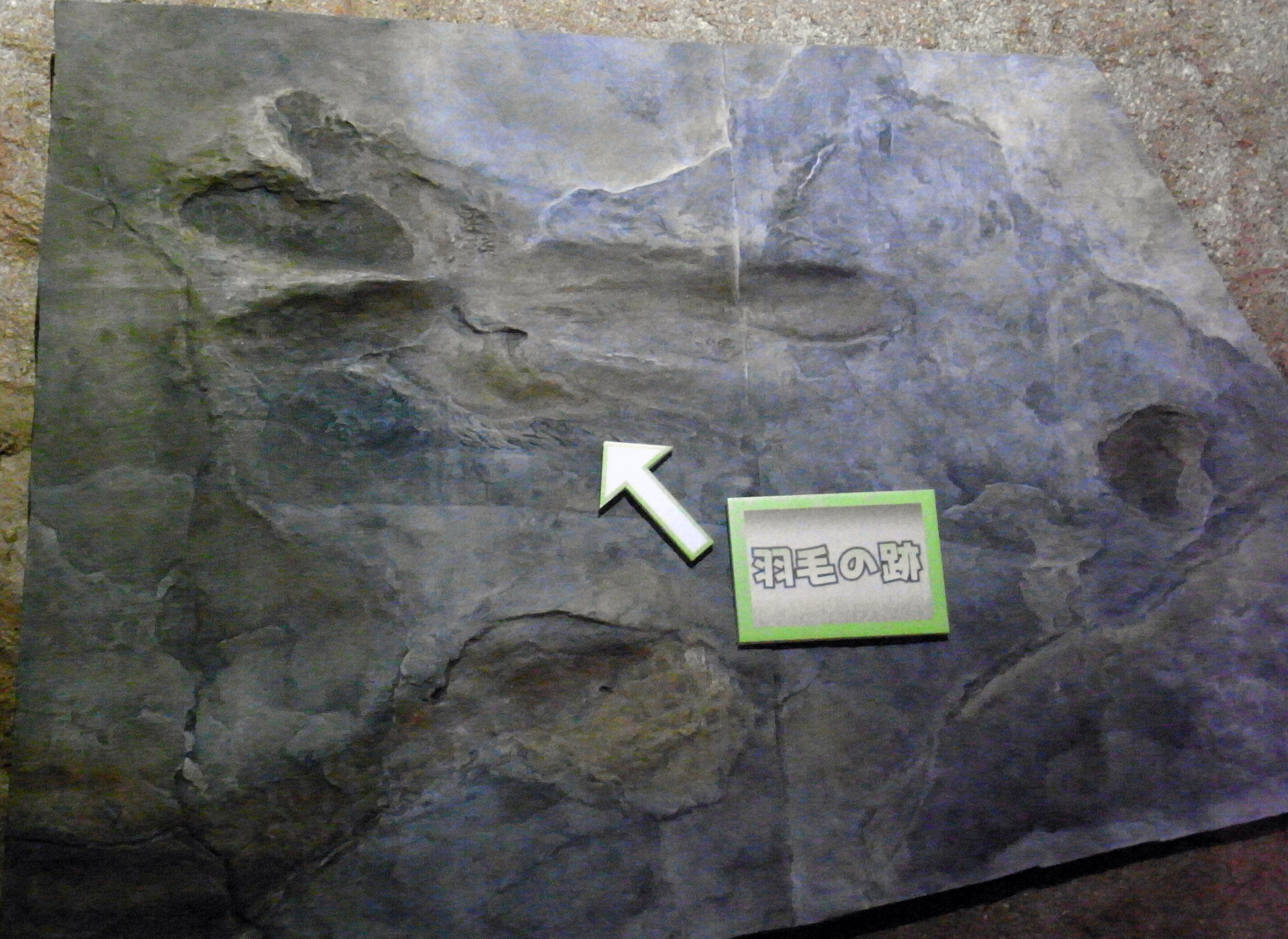
Cast in Japan of a resting trace from Massachusetts, which was argued to have been made by a theropod like Dilophosaurus and to include feather impressions around the belly (arrow), but that has been questioned.

The first known specimen of Archaeopteryx, on the basis of which the genus was named, was an isolated feather, although whether or not it belongs to Archaeopteryx has been controversial. One of the earliest discoveries of possible feather impressions by non-avian dinosaurs is a trace fossil (Fulicopus lyellii) of the 195–199 million year old Portland Formation in the northeastern United States. Gierlinski (1996, 1997, 1998) and Kundrát (2004) have interpreted traces between two footprints in this fossil as feather impressions from the belly of a squatting dilophosaurid. Although some reviewers have raised questions about the naming and interpretation of this fossil, if correct, that early Jurassic fossil is the oldest known evidence of feathers, almost 30 million years older than the next-oldest-known evidence.

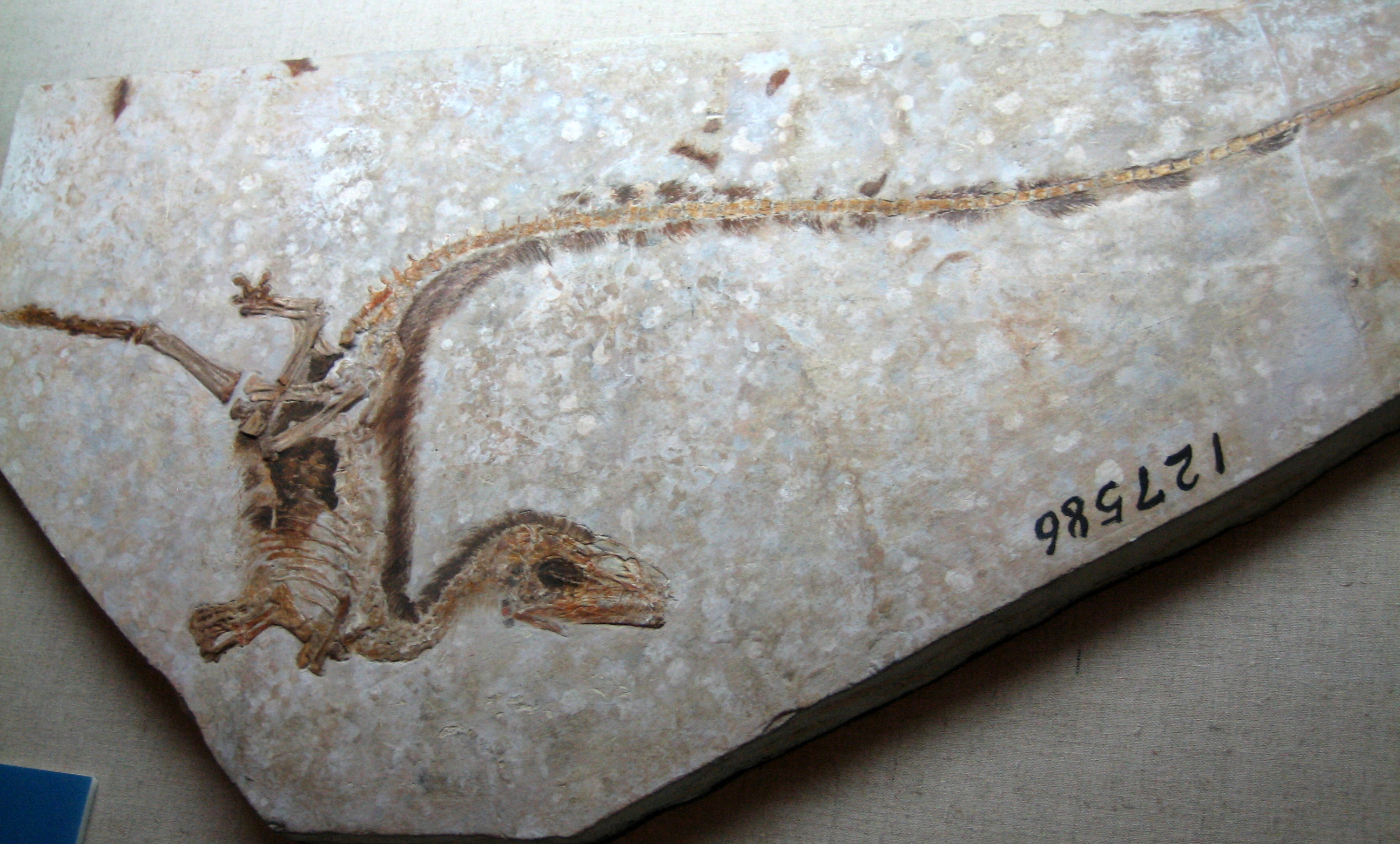
Sinosauropteryx fossil, the first fossil of a definitively non-avialan dinosaur with feathers

The most important discoveries at Liaoning have been a host of feathered dinosaur fossils, with a steady stream of new finds filling in the picture of the dinosaur–bird connection and adding more to theories of the evolutionary development of feathers and flight. Turner et al. (2007) reported quill knobs from an ulna of Velociraptor mongoliensis, and these are strongly correlated with large and well-developed secondary feathers.

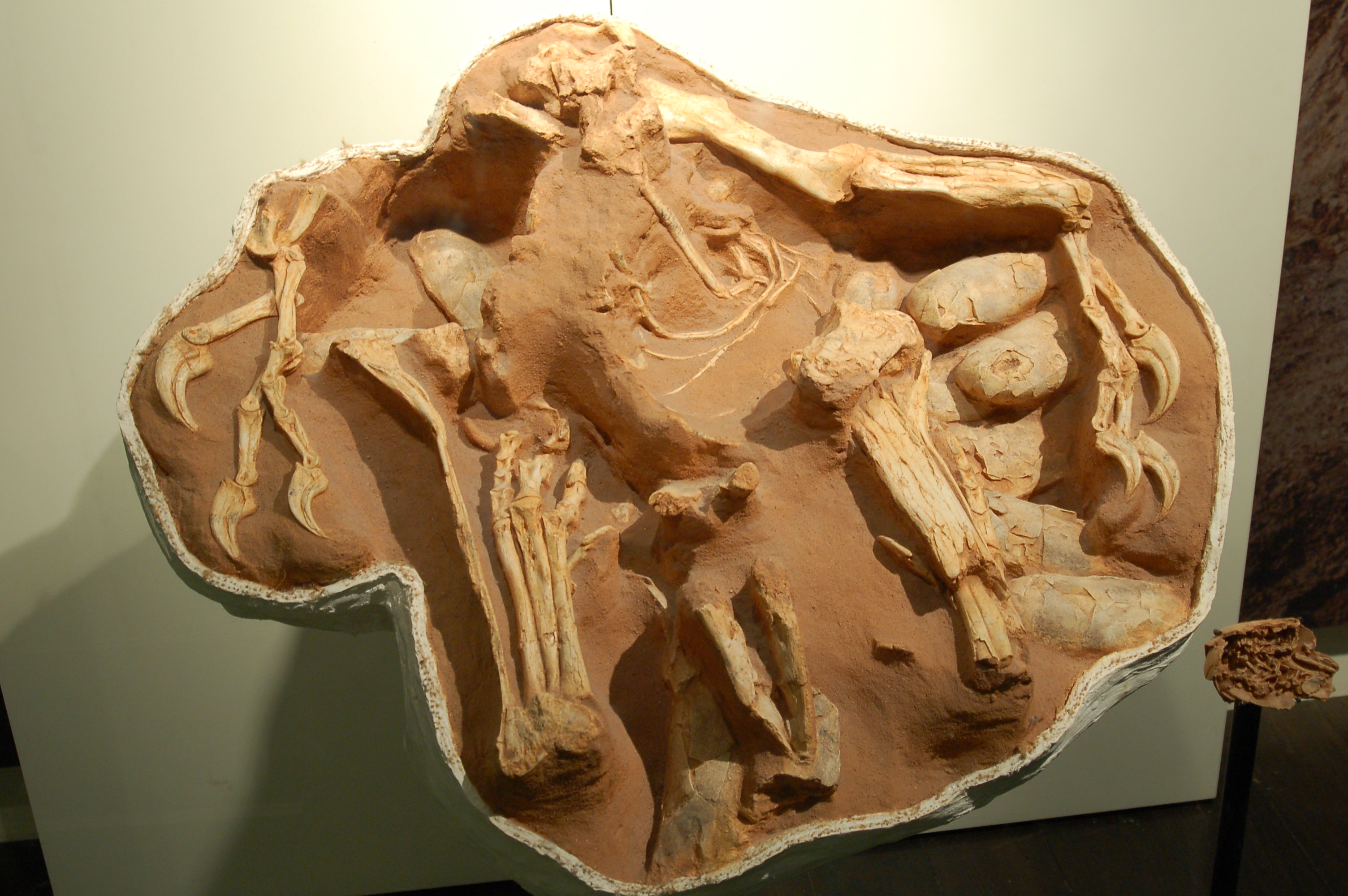
A nesting Citipati osmolskae specimen, at the AMNH

Behavioural evidence, in the form of an oviraptorosaur on its nest, showed another link with birds. Its forearms were folded, like those of a bird. Although no feathers were preserved, it is likely that these would have been present to insulate eggs and juveniles.

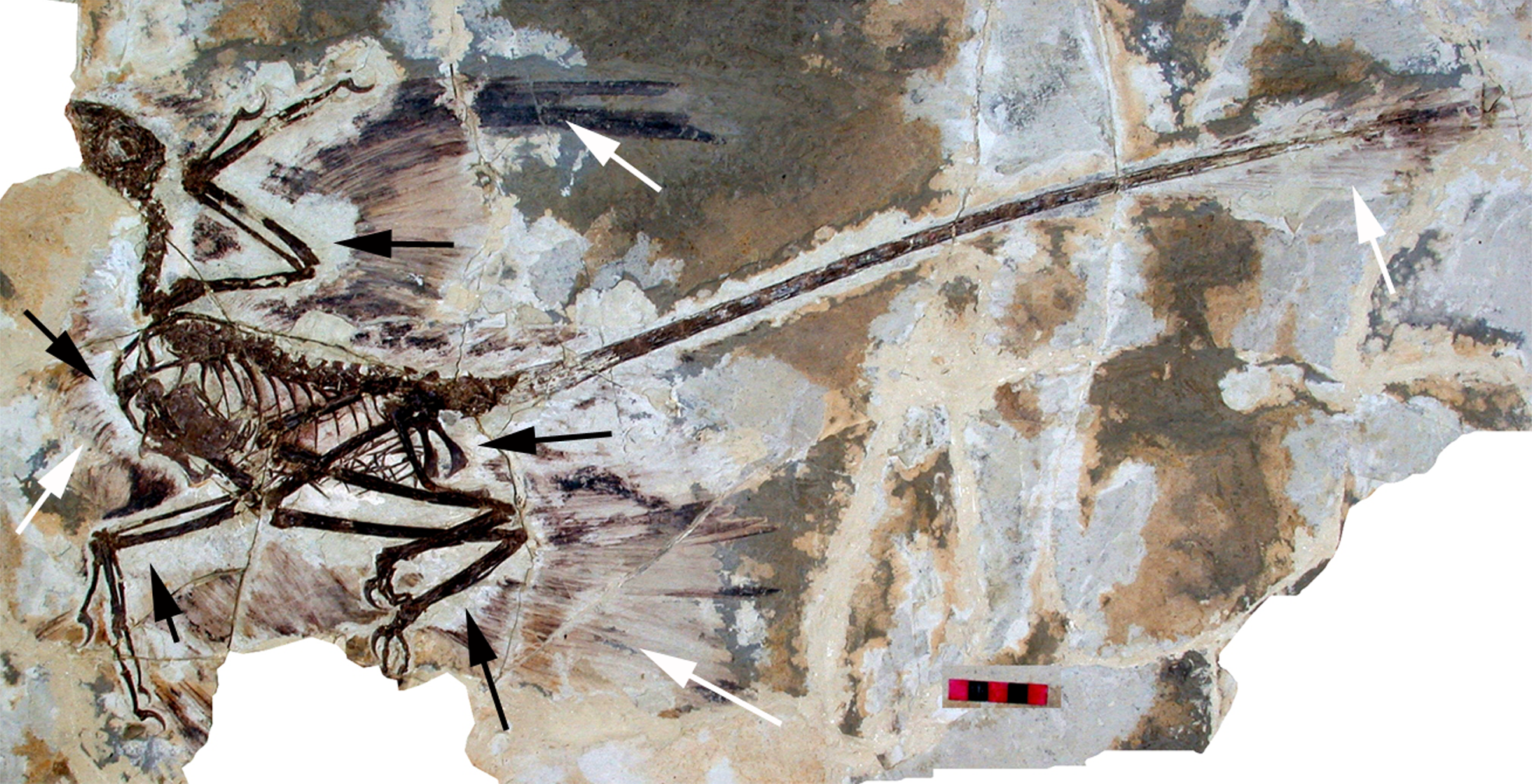
Fossil of Microraptor gui includes impressions of feathered wings (see arrows)

Not all of the Chinese fossil discoveries proved valid however. In 1999, a supposed fossil of an apparently feathered dinosaur named Archaeoraptor liaoningensis, also found in Liaoning, turned out to be a forgery. Comparing the photograph of the specimen with another find, Chinese paleontologist Xu Xing came to the conclusion that it was composed of two portions of different fossil animals. His claim made National Geographic review their research and they too came to the same conclusion.

In 2011, samples of amber were discovered to contain preserved feathers from 75 to 80 million years ago during the Cretaceous Period, with evidence that they were from both dinosaurs and birds. Initial analysis suggests that some of the feathers were used for insulation, and not flight. More complex feathers were revealed to have variations in coloration similar to modern birds, while simpler protofeathers were predominantly dark. Only 11 specimens are currently known. The specimens are too rare to be broken open to study their melanosomes (pigment-bearing organelles), but there are plans for using non-destructive high-resolution X-ray imaging. Melanosomes produce colouration in feathers; as differently-shaped melanosomes produce different colours, subsequent research on melanosomes preserved in feathered dinosaur specimens has led to reconstructions of the life appearance of several dinosaur species. These include Anchiornis, Sinosauropteryx, Microraptor, and Archaeopteryx.

In 2016, the discovery was announced of a feathered dinosaur tail preserved in amber that is estimated to be 99 million years old. Lida Xing, a researcher from the China University of Geosciences in Beijing, found the specimen at an amber market in Myanmar. It is the first definitive discovery of dinosaur material in amber.

== Current knowledge ==
=== Non-avian dinosaur species preserved with evidence of feathers ===
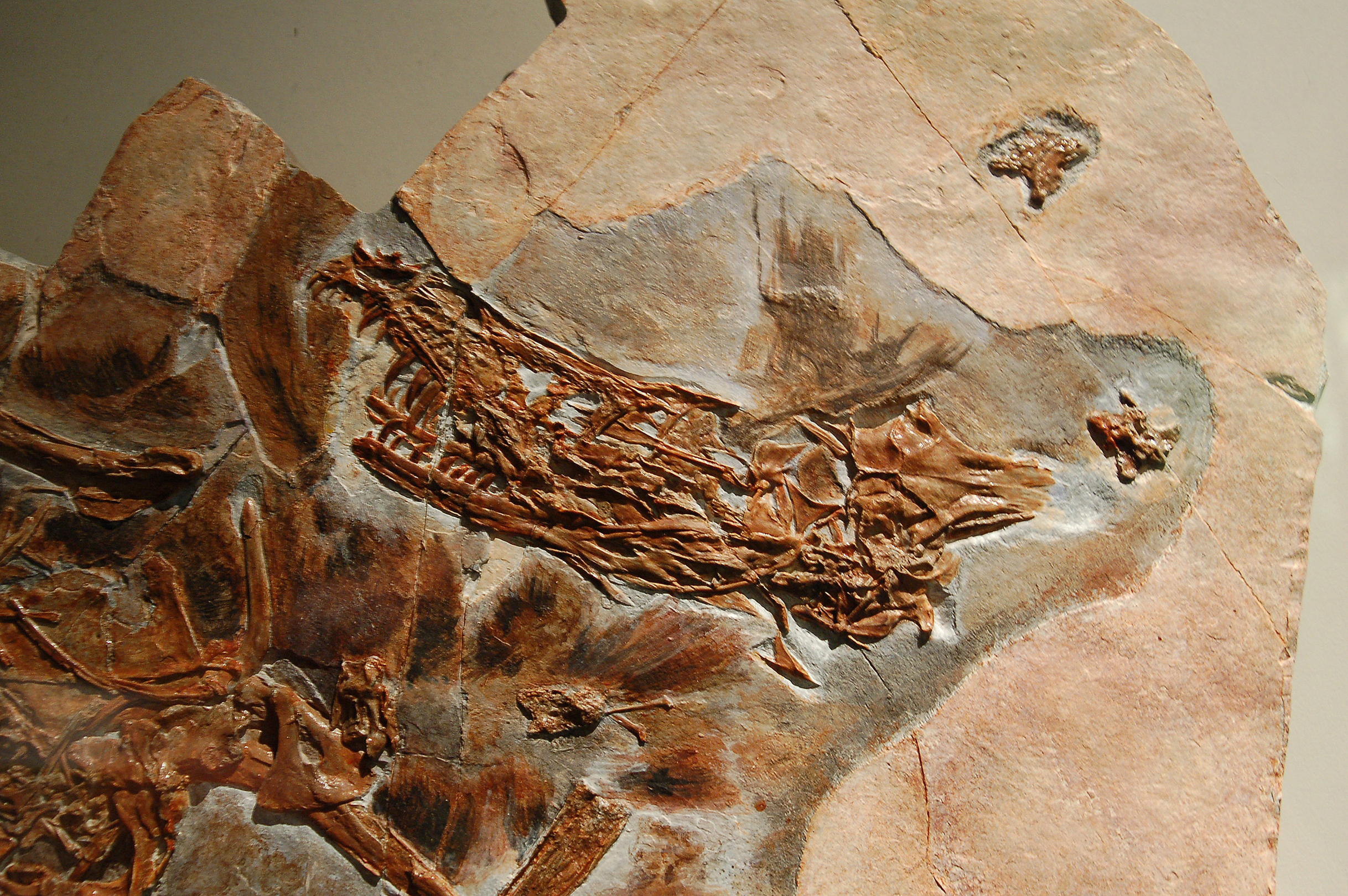
Fossil of Sinornithosaurus millenii, the first evidence of feathers in dromaeosaurids

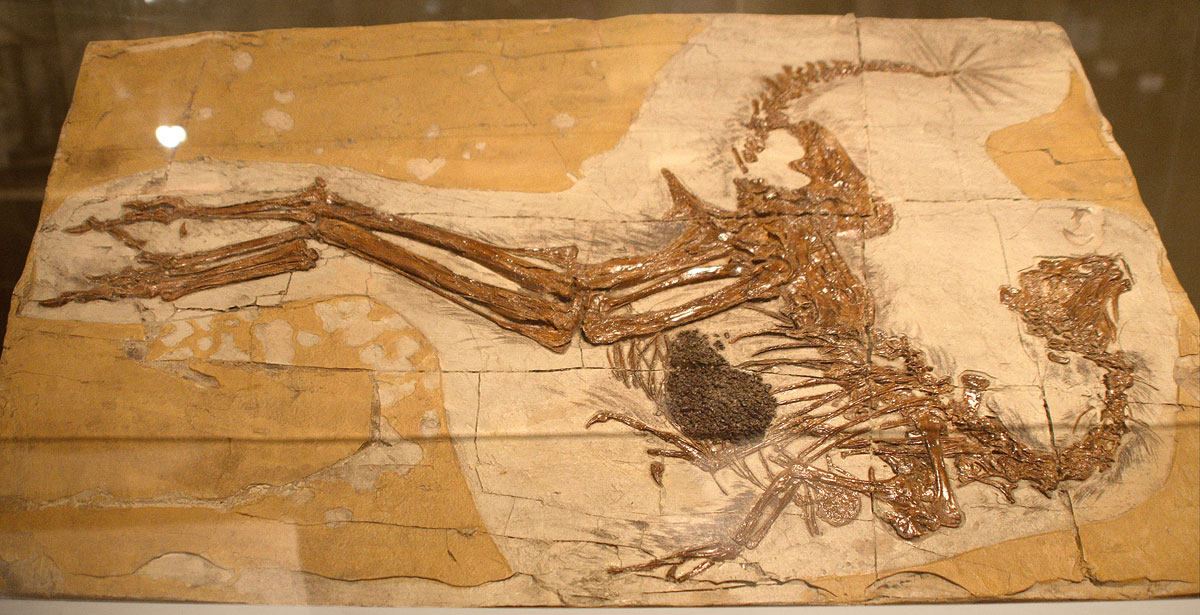
Cast of a Caudipteryx fossil with feather impressions and stomach content

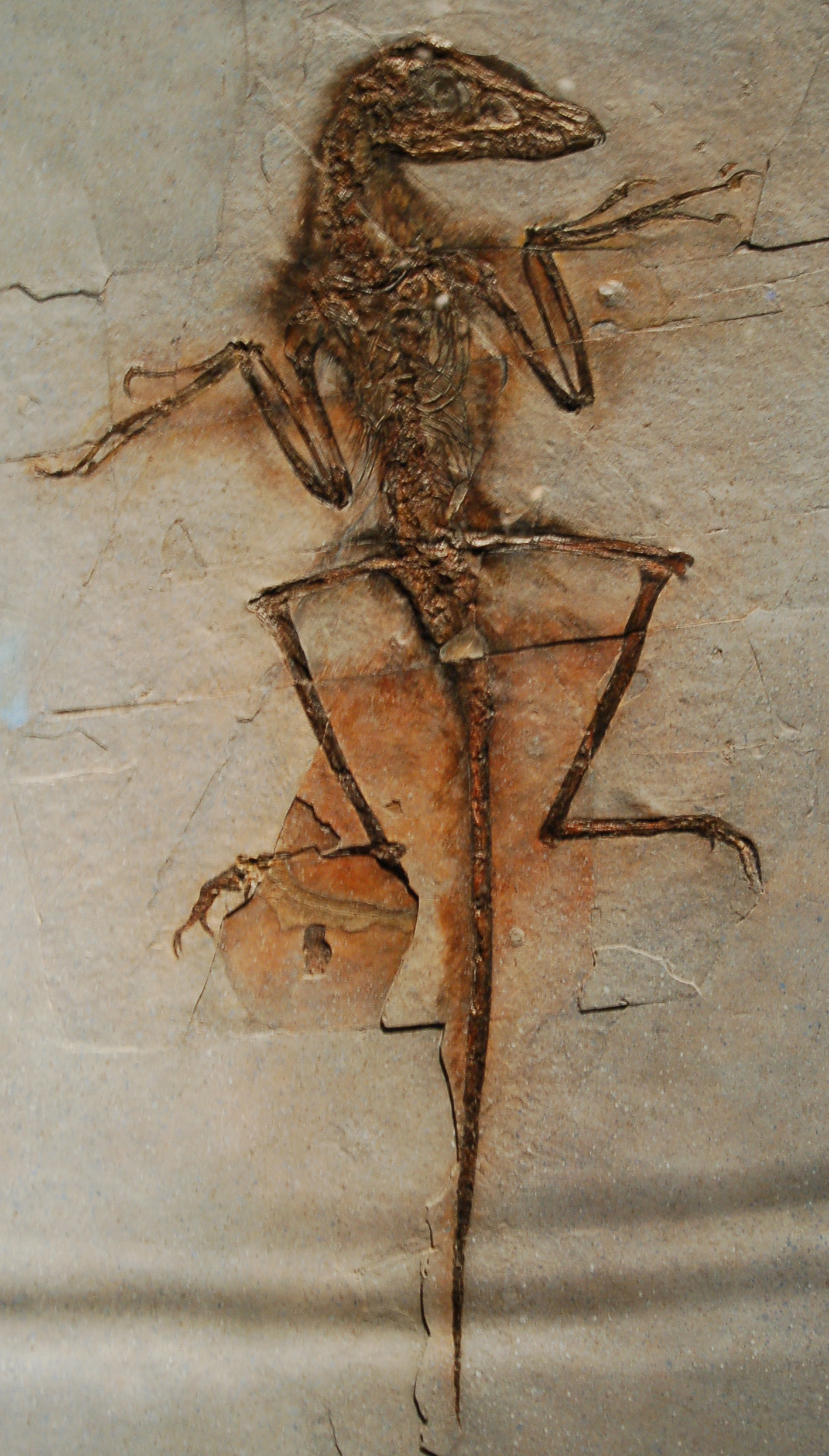
Fossil cast of a Sinornithosaurus millenii

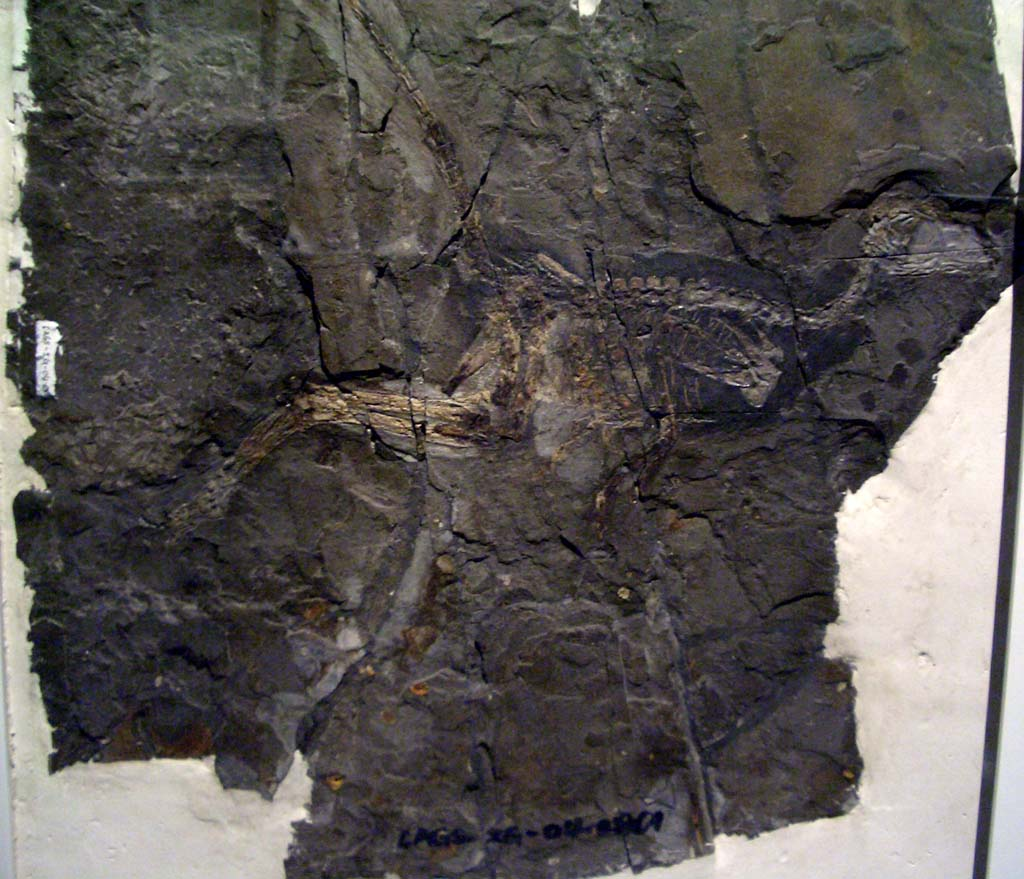
Jinfengopteryx elegans fossil

Several non-avian dinosaurs are now known to have been feathered. Direct evidence of feathers exists for several species. In all examples, the evidence described consists of feather impressions, except those genera inferred to have had feathers based on skeletal or chemical evidence, such as the presence of quill knobs (the anchor points for wing feathers on the forelimb) or a pygostyle (the fused vertebrae at the tail tip which often supports large feathers).

=== Primitive feather types ===
Integumentary structures that gave rise to the feathers of birds are seen in the dorsal spines of reptiles and fish. A similar stage in their evolution to the complex coats of birds and mammals can be observed in living reptiles such as iguanas and Gonocephalus agamids. Feather structures are thought to have proceeded from simple hollow filaments through several stages of increasing complexity, ending with the large, deeply rooted feathers with strong pens (rachis), barbs and barbules that birds display today.

According to Prum's (1999) proposed model, at stage I, the follicle originates with a cylindrical epidermal depression around the base of the feather papilla. The first feather resulted when undifferentiated tubular follicle collar developed out of the old keratinocytes being pushed out. At stage II, the inner, basilar layer of the follicle collar differentiated into longitudinal barb ridges with unbranched keratin filaments, while the thin peripheral layer of the collar became the deciduous sheath, forming a tuft of unbranched barbs with a basal calamus. Stage III consists of two developmental novelties, IIIa and IIIb, as either could have occurred first. Stage IIIa involves helical displacement of barb ridges arising within the collar. The barb ridges on the anterior midline of the follicle fuse together, forming the rachis. The creation of a posterior barb locus follows, giving an indeterminate number of barbs. This resulted in a feather with a symmetrical, primarily branched structure with a rachis and unbranched barbs. In stage IIIb, barbules paired within the peripheral barbule plates of the barb ridges, create branched barbs with rami and barbules. This resulting feather is one with a tuft of branched barbs without a rachis. At stage IV, differentiated distal and proximal barbules produce a closed, pennaceous vane (a contour feather). A closed vane develops when pennulae on the distal barbules form a hooked shape to attach to the simpler proximal barbules of the adjacent barb. Stage V developmental novelties gave rise to additional structural diversity in the closed pennaceous feather. Here, asymmetrical flight feathers, bipinnate plumulaceous feathers, filoplumes, powder down, and bristles evolved.

Some evidence suggests that the original function of simple feathers was insulation. In particular, preserved patches of skin in large, derived, tyrannosauroids show scutes, while those in smaller, more primitive, forms show feathers. This may indicate that the larger forms had complex skins, with both scutes and filaments, or that tyrannosauroids may be like rhinos and elephants, having filaments at birth and then losing them as they developed to maturity. An adult Tyrannosaurus rex weighed about as much as an African elephant. If large tyrannosauroids were endotherms, they would have needed to radiate heat efficiently. This is due to the different structural properties of feathers compared to fur.

Some evidence also suggests that more derived feather types may have served as insulation. For instance, a study of oviraptorid pennaceous wing feathers and nesting posture suggests that elongated wing feathers evidently may have served to fill gaps between brooding individuals' insulatory body chamber and the outside environment. This "wall" of wing feathers could have shielded eggs from temperature extremes.

There is an increasing body of evidence that supports the display hypothesis, which states that early feathers were colored and increased reproductive success. Coloration could have provided the original adaptation of feathers, implying that all later functions of feathers, such as thermoregulation and flight, were co-opted. This hypothesis has been supported by the discovery of pigmented feathers in multiple species. Supporting the display hypothesis is the fact that fossil feathers have been observed in a ground-dwelling herbivorous dinosaur clade, making it unlikely that feathers functioned as predatory tools or as a means of flight. Additionally, some specimens have iridescent feathers. Pigmented and iridescent feathers may have provided greater attractiveness to mates, providing enhanced reproductive success when compared to non-colored feathers. Current research shows that it is plausible that theropods would have had the visual acuity necessary to see the displays. In a study by Stevens (2006), the binocular field of view for Velociraptor has been estimated to be 55 to 60 degrees, which is about that of modern owls. Visual acuity for Tyrannosaurus has been predicted to be anywhere from about that of humans to 13 times that of humans. Paleontological and evolutionary developmental studies show that feathers or feather-like structures were converting back to scales.

The idea that precursors of feathers appeared before they were co-opted for insulation is already stated in Gould and Vrba (1982). The original benefit might have been metabolic. Feathers are largely made of the keratin protein complex, which has disulfide bonds between amino acids that give it stability and elasticity. The metabolism of amino acids containing sulfur can be toxic; however, if the sulfur amino acids are not catabolized as the final products of urea or uric acid but used for the synthesis of keratin instead, the release of hydrogen sulfide is extremely reduced or avoided. For an organism whose metabolism works at high internal temperatures of 40 °C (104 °F) or greater, it can be extremely important to prevent the excess production of hydrogen sulfide. This hypothesis could be consistent with the need for high metabolic rate of theropod dinosaurs.

The point is not known with certainty in archosaur phylogeny that the earliest simple "protofeathers" arose, as well as whether they arose once or independently multiple times. Filamentous structures are clearly present in pterosaurs, and long, hollow quills have been reported in specimens of the ornithischian dinosaurs Psittacosaurus and Tianyulong although there has been disagreement. In 2009, Xu et al. noted that the hollow, unbranched, stiff integumentary structures found on a specimen of Beipiaosaurus were strikingly similar to the integumentary structures of Psittacosaurus and pterosaurs. They suggested that all of these structures may have been inherited from a common ancestor much earlier in the evolution of archosaurs, possibly in an ornithodire from the Middle Triassic or earlier. More recently, findings in Russia of the basal neornithischian Kulindadromeus report that although the lower leg and tail seemed to be scaled, "varied integumentary structures were found directly associated with skeletal elements, supporting the hypothesis that simple filamentous feathers, as well as compound feather-like structures comparable to those in theropods, were widespread amongst the whole dinosaur clade." In contrast, a 2016 study published in the Journal of Geology suggested that the integumentary structures found on Kulindadromeus and Psittacosaurus may be highly deformed scales rather than filamentous feathers.

Display feathers are also known from dinosaurs that are very primitive members of the bird lineage, or Avialae. The most primitive example is Epidexipteryx, which had a short tail with extremely long, ribbon-like feathers. Oddly enough, the fossil does not preserve wing feathers, suggesting that Epidexipteryx was either secondarily flightless, or that display feathers evolved before flight feathers in the bird lineage. Plumaceous feathers are found in nearly all lineages of Theropoda common in the northern hemisphere, and pennaceous feathers are attested as far down the tree as the Ornithomimosauria. The fact that only adult Ornithomimus had wing-like structures suggests that pennaceous feathers evolved for mating displays.

== Phylogeny and inference of feathers in other dinosaurs ==
This technique, called phylogenetic bracketing, can also be used to infer the type of feathers a species may have had, since the developmental history of feathers is now reasonably well-known. All feathered species had filamentaceous or plumaceous (downy) feathers, with pennaceous feathers found among the more bird-like groups. The following cladogram is adapted from Godefroit et al., 2013.

Grey denotes a clade that is not known to contain any feathered specimen at the time of writing, some of which have fossil evidence of scales. The presence or lack of feathered specimens in a given clade does not confirm that all members in a clade have the specified integument, unless corroborated with representative fossil evidence within clade members.

- Neotheropoda
  - Dilophosauridae
  - Orionides
    - Megalosauroidea
    - Avetheropoda
      - Carnosauria
      - Coelurosauria
        - Sciurumimus – filamentous feathers
        - Tyrannoraptora
          - Tyrannosauroidea (Dilong, Yutyrannus) – plumulaceous feathers
          - - Sinocalliopteryx – plumulaceous feathers
            - - Compsognathidae (Sinosauropteryx, GMV 2124) – plumulaceous feathers
              - - - Juravenator – filamentous feathers
                  - Ornitholestes
                - Maniraptoriformes
                  - Ornithomimosauria (Ornithomimus, Deinocheirus) – plumulaceous feathers
                  - Maniraptora
                    - Alvarezsauridae (Shuvuuia) – plumulaceous feathers
                    - - Therizinosauroidea (Beipiaosaurus, Jianchangosaurus) – plumulaceous feathers
                      - Pennaraptora
                        - Oviraptorosauria (Avimimus, Nomingia, Caudipteryx, Similicaudipteryx, Protarchaeopteryx, Ningyuansaurus, Citipati, Conchoraptor) – pennaceous feathers
                        - Paraves
                          - Scansoriopterygidae (Scansoriopteryx, Epidexipteryx) – pennaceous feathers
                          - - Eosinopteryx – pennaceous feathers
                            - Eumaniraptora
                              - Dromaeosauridae (Sinornithosaurus, Microraptor, Velociraptor, Changyuraptor) – pennaceous feathers
                              - - Troodontidae (Jinfengopteryx) – pennaceous feathers
                                - Avialae (group including modern birds)

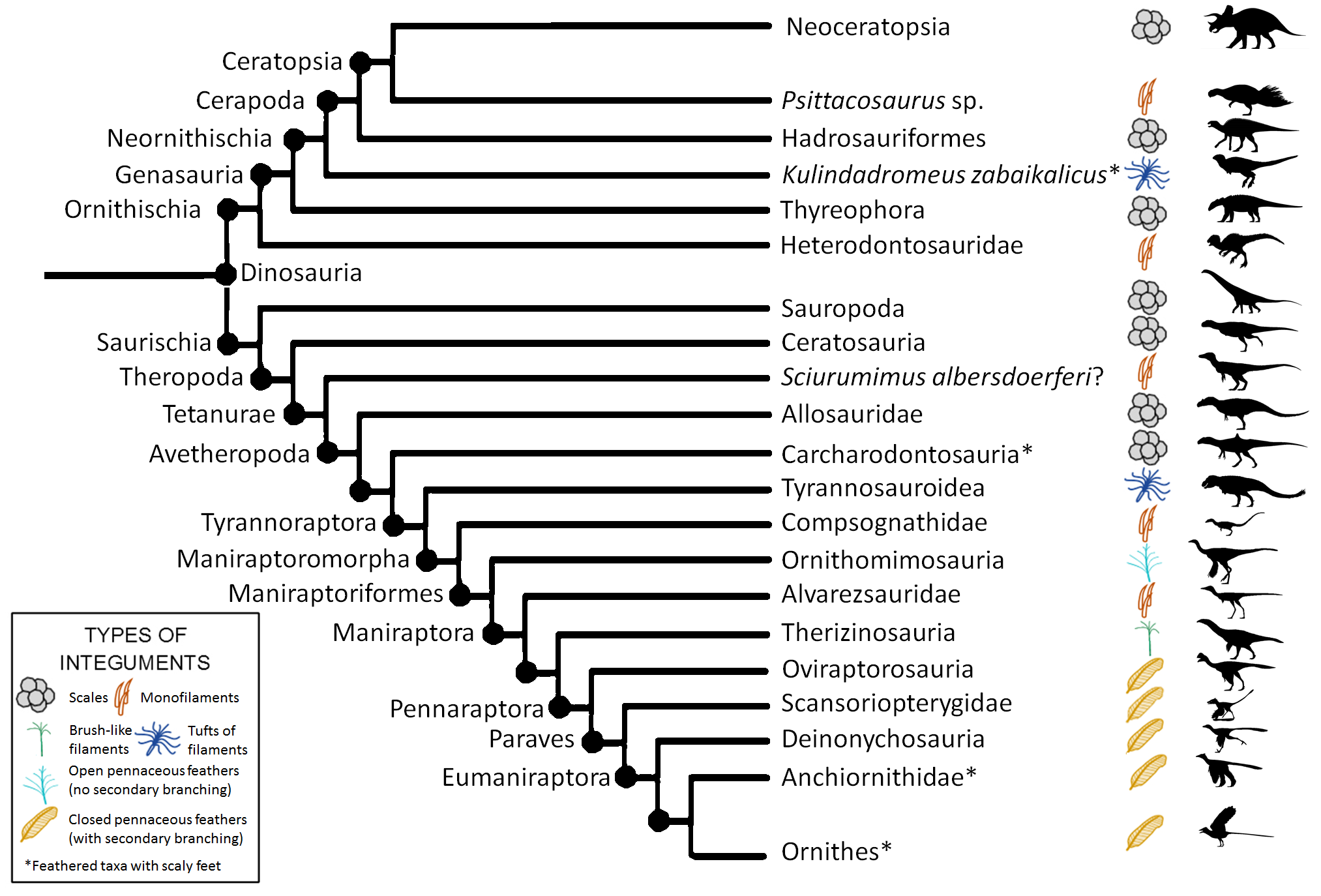
Cladogram showing distribution of feathers in Dinosauria, as of 2019. The groups that are marked with scales did not necessarily lack feathers but simply have never been found with feather impressions.

The following cladogram is from Xu (2020).

1. Slender monofilamentous integument
2. Broad monofilamentous integument
3. Basally joining filamentous feather
4. Basally joining shafter filamentous feather
5. Radially branched shafted filamentous feather
6. Bilaterally branched filamentous feather
7. Basally joining branched filamentous feather
8. Basally joining membranous-based filamentous feather
9. Symmetrical open-vaned feather
10. Symmetrical close-vaned feather
11. Asymmetrical close-vaned feather
12. Proximally ribbon-like close-vaned feather
13. Rachis-dominant close-vaned feather

- Crocodilians and relatives
- Ornithodira
  - Pterosauria 1?
  - Dinosauria
    - Ornithischia
      - - Heterodontosaurus
        - Tianyulong 1?
      - - Kulindadromeus 1?, 3?
        - - Psittacosaurus 1?
          - Triceratops
    - - Sauropodomorpha
      - - Coelophysis
        - - Sciurumimus 1
          - - Concavenator
            - Coelurosauria
              - - Yutyrannus 2, 3?, 4?, 5?, 6?
                - - Dilong 3?, 4?, 5?, 6?
                  - Tyrannosaurus
              - - Ornithomimus edmontonicus 1?, 2?, 3?
                - Maniraptora
                  - Sinosauropteryx 3?, 4, 5?, 6?
                  - - - Beipiaosaurus 2, 3?, 4?, 5?, 6?
                      - Therizinosaurus
                    - - - Haplocheirus
                        - Shuvuuia 1?
                      - Pennaraptora
                        - - Protarchaeopteryx 3?, 4?, 5?, 6?, 9?, 10
                          - Incisivosaurus 3?, 4?, 5?, 6?, 10, 12
                        - Paraves
                          - - Epidexipteryx 3?, 4?, 5?, 6?, 8, 13
                            - Yi 3?, 4?, 5?, 6?, 7
                          - - Avialae (most types)
                            - - - Anchiornis 3?, 4?, 5?, 6?, 7?, 10
                                - Jianianhualong 3?, 4?, 5?, 6?, 10, 11
                              - - Microraptor 3?, 4?, 5?, 6?, 10, 11
                                - Sinornithosaurus 3, 4, 5?, 6?, 10

== See also ==
- Origin of birds – Central question in evolutionary biology of birds
- Dinosaur Discovery Museum
