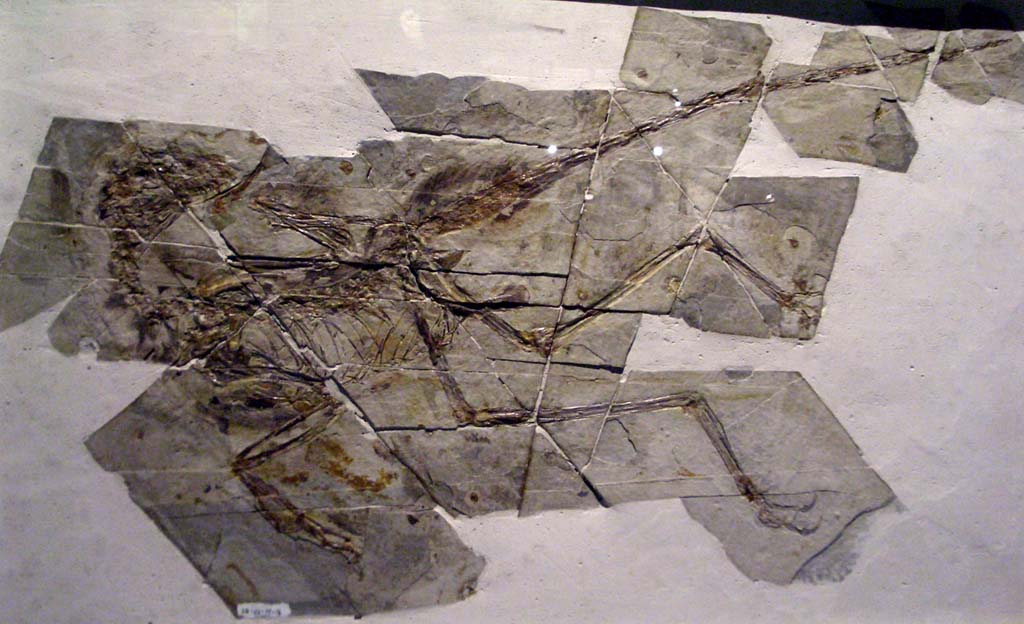
- S. millenii fossil, Hong Kong Science Museum

Scientific classification
- Kingdom: Animalia
- Phylum: Chordata
- Class: Reptilia
- Clade: Dinosauria
- Clade: Saurischia
- Clade: Theropoda
- Family: †Dromaeosauridae
- Clade: †Microraptoria
- Genus: †Sinornithosaurus; Xu, Wang & Wu, 1999

Type species
- †Sinornithosaurus millenii Xu, Wang, & Wu, 1999

Species
- †S. millenii Xu, Wang, & Wu, 1999; †S. haoiana? Liu, Ji, Tang & Gao, 2004

= Sinornithosaurus =

Sinornithosaurus Temporal range: Early Cretaceous (Barremian), 125.46–124.12 Ma

Extinct genus of dinosaurs

Sinornithosaurus (derived from a combination of Latin and Greek, meaning 'Chinese bird-lizard') is a genus of feathered dromaeosaurid dinosaur from the early Cretaceous Period (late Barremian) of the Yixian Formation in what is now China. It was the fifth non–avian feathered dinosaur genus discovered by 1999. The original specimen was collected from the Sihetun locality of western Liaoning. It was found in the Jianshangou beds of the Yixian Formation, dated to 124.5 million years ago. Additional specimens have been found in the younger Dawangzhangzi bed, dating to around 122 million years ago.

Xu Xing described Sinornithosaurus and performed a phylogenetic analysis which demonstrated that it is basal, or primitive, among the dromaeosaurs. He has also demonstrated that features of the skull and shoulder are very similar to Archaeopteryx and other avialans. Together these two facts demonstrate that the earliest dromaeosaurs were more like birds than the later dromaeosaurs were.

Sinornithosaurus was among the smallest dromaeosaurids, with the holotype measuring 1.2 metres (3.9 ft) long and weighing 3–5 kilograms (6.6–11.0 lb).

== Description ==
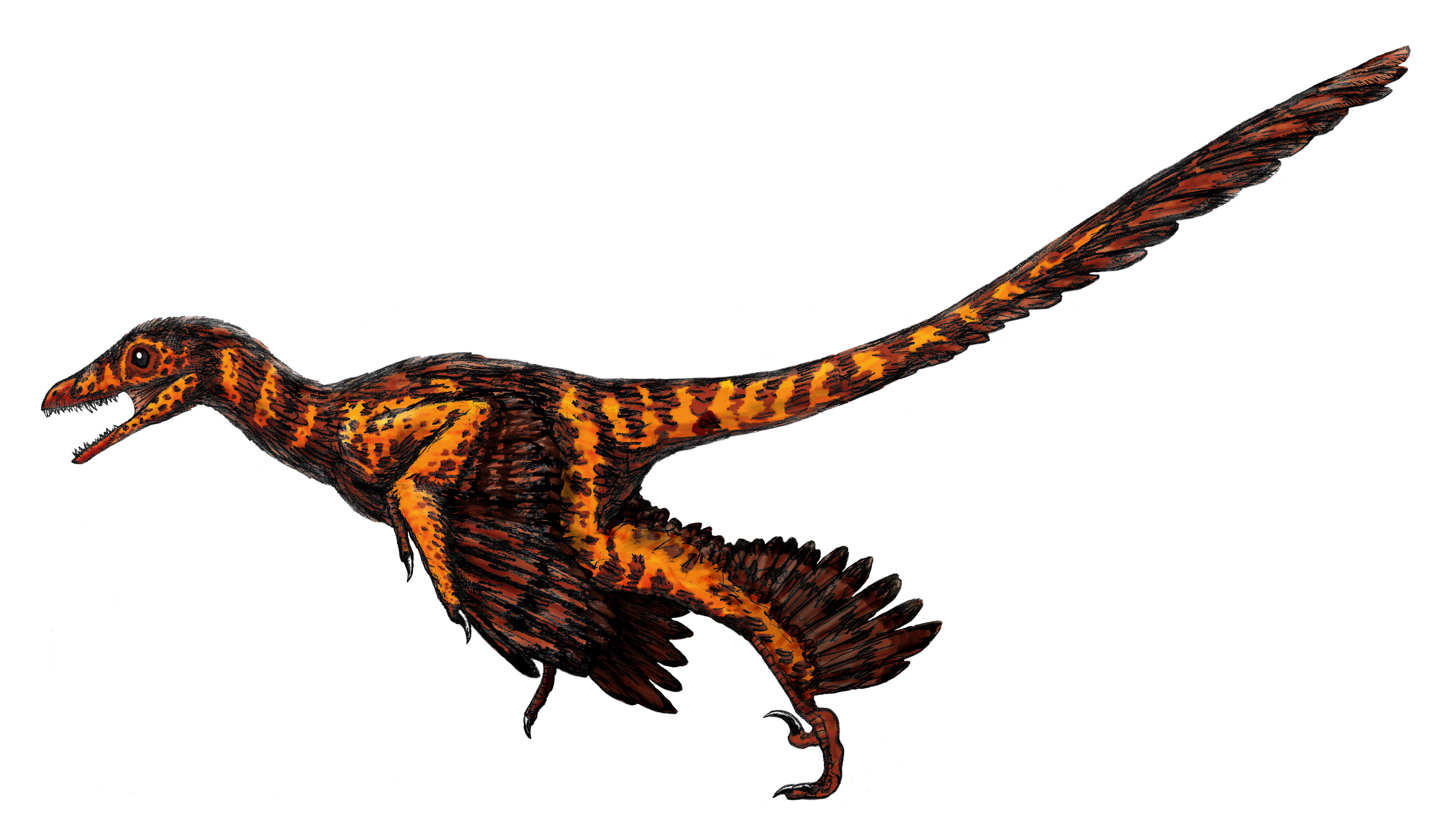
Artist's impression of S. millenii

Specimens of Sinornithosaurus have preserved impressions of feathers both covering the entirety of the body and forming the wings. These feathers were indistinguishable in form from those found on birds from the same geological deposits. The body (contour) feathers were generally between 3–4.5 cm long and included two types: the first type are formed of several filaments joined into "tufts", similar to modern down feathers. The second type, including those on the arms, were composed of rows of filaments (barbs) joined along a main shaft (rachis), making them similar in structure to modern bird feathers. However, unlike the wing feathers of flying birds, they did not have the secondary branches with tiny little hooks (barbules) that flight feathers have, which allow the flight feathers to form a continuous vane. Some scientists have suggested that the feathers might have allowed Sinornithosaurus to glide for short distances after leaping from trees.

A 2010 study indicated that Sinornithosaurus may have had feathers which varied in color significantly across different regions of the body, based on analysis of microscopic cell structures in preserved fossils. Based on the rod and spherical melanosomes found in some samples, scientists have interpreted that Sinornithosaurus had black and rufous feathers.

== Paleobiology ==
=== Possible venomous bite ===
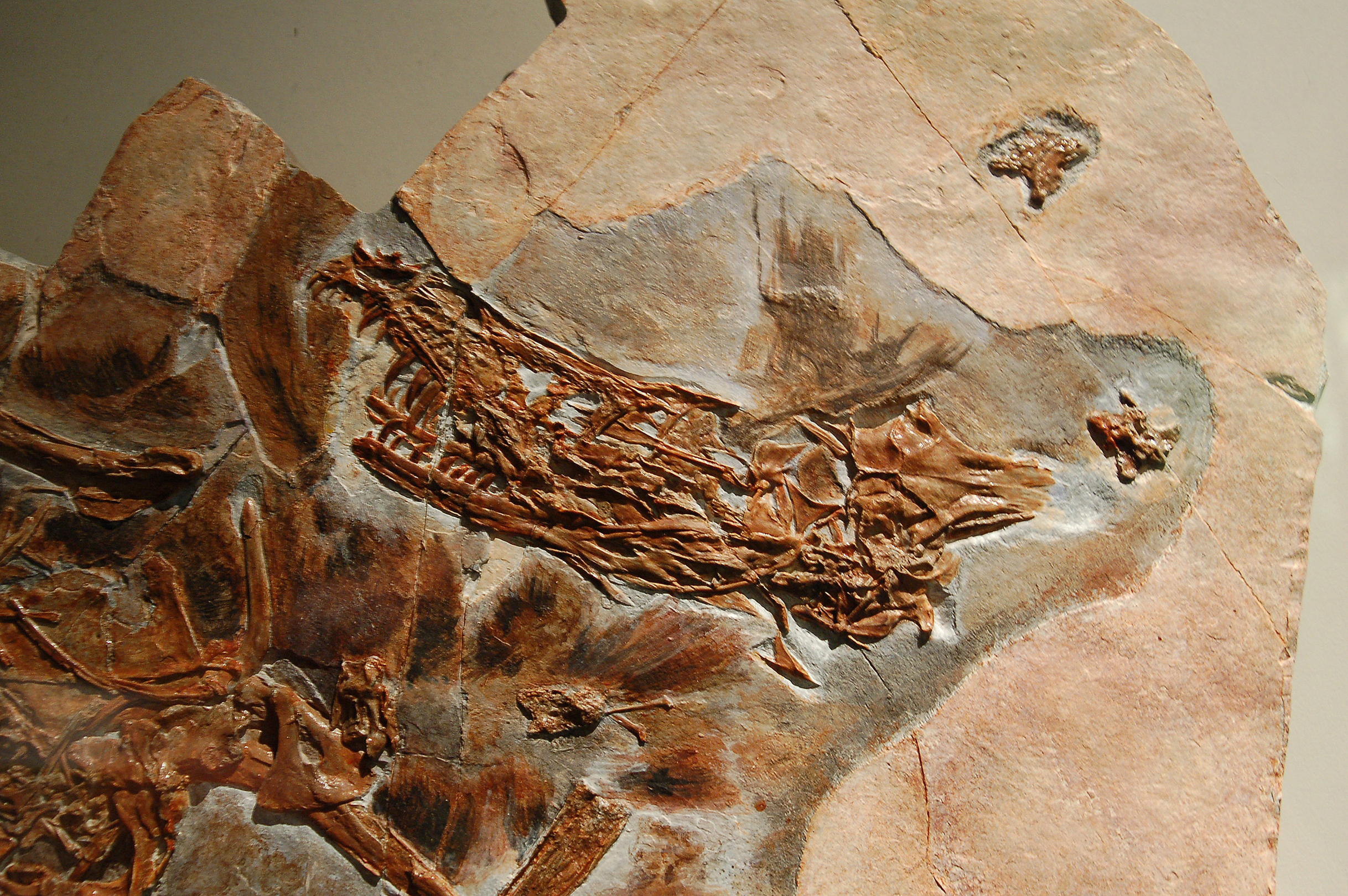
Cast of the holotype fossil

In 2009, a team of scientists led by Empu Gong examined a well-preserved Sinornithosaurus skull, and noted several features suggesting it was the first-identified venomous dinosaur. Gong and colleagues noted that the unusually long and fang-like mid-jaw (maxillary) teeth had prominent grooves running down the outer surface, towards the rear of the tooth, a feature seen only in venomous animals. They also interpreted a cavity in the jaw bone just above these teeth as the possible site for the soft-tissue venom gland. Gong and colleagues suggested that these unique features indicated that Sinornithosaurus may have specialized in hunting small prey such as birds, using its long fangs to penetrate feathers and envenomate and stun the prey, like a modern snake. They also suggested that the short, slightly forward-pointing teeth at the tip of the jaw could have been used to strip feathers from birds.

Some palaeontologists have hypothesized that Sinornithosaurus millenii had venom due to some dentitional similarities to modern venomous snakes.

However, in 2010, another team of scientists led by Federico Gianechini published a paper casting doubts on the claim that Sinornithosaurus was venomous. They noted that grooved teeth are not unique to this genus, and in fact grooved teeth are found in many other theropods, including other dromaeosaurids. They also demonstrated that the teeth were not abnormally long as Gong and his team claimed, but rather had come out of their sockets, a preservational artifact common in crushed and flattened fossils. Finally, they could not independently verify the presence of supposed chambers for venom glands cited by Gong's team, finding only the normal sinuses of the skull.

In the same journal issue, Gong and his team submitted a reassessment of the 2009 study, casting doubt on their findings. They admitted that grooved teeth were common among theropods (though they suggested they were really only prevalent among feathered maniraptorans), and hypothesized that venom may have been a primitive trait for all archosaurs if not all reptiles, which was retained in certain lineages. They also disputed the claim that the teeth were significantly out of their sockets in the holotype specimen of Sinornithosaurus, though they admitted that they were not in a completely natural position. Gong's reassessment also claimed that certain undescribed specimens had fully articulated teeth showing a similar length. However, these grooved teeth are not direct evidence of venom, as non-venomous species of animals (such as baboons) have similarly grooved teeth.

=== Circadian rhythm ===
Comparisons between the scleral rings of Sinornithosaurus and modern birds and reptiles indicate that it may have been cathemeral, active throughout the day and night at short intervals.

=== Flight/gliding ===
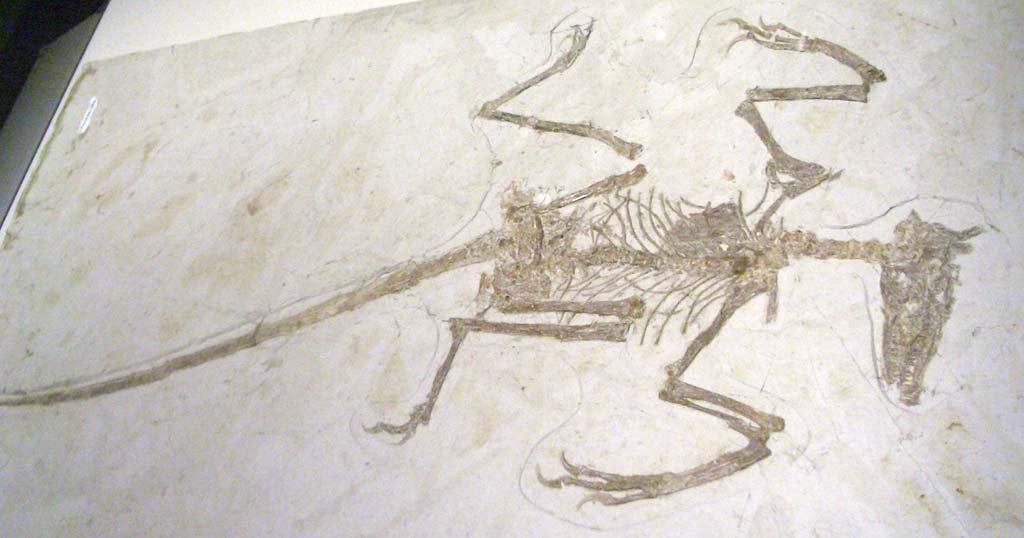
Referred specimen, Hong Kong Science Museum

The possibility that Sinornithosaurus was capable of gliding has been presented several times, due to its close relation to flying or gliding dromaeosaurs like Microraptor. Chatterjee and Templin 2004 found S. millenii as grouping within dinosaurs with aerodynamic potential for aerial locomotion, an opinion latter also expressed by Darren Naish, while Longrich & Currie 2009 have expressed that it was probably too heavy to fly, though it is worth to note that this latter study was published before the formal description of Changyuraptor, a larger microraptorine with evident flight capacities.

== Classification ==
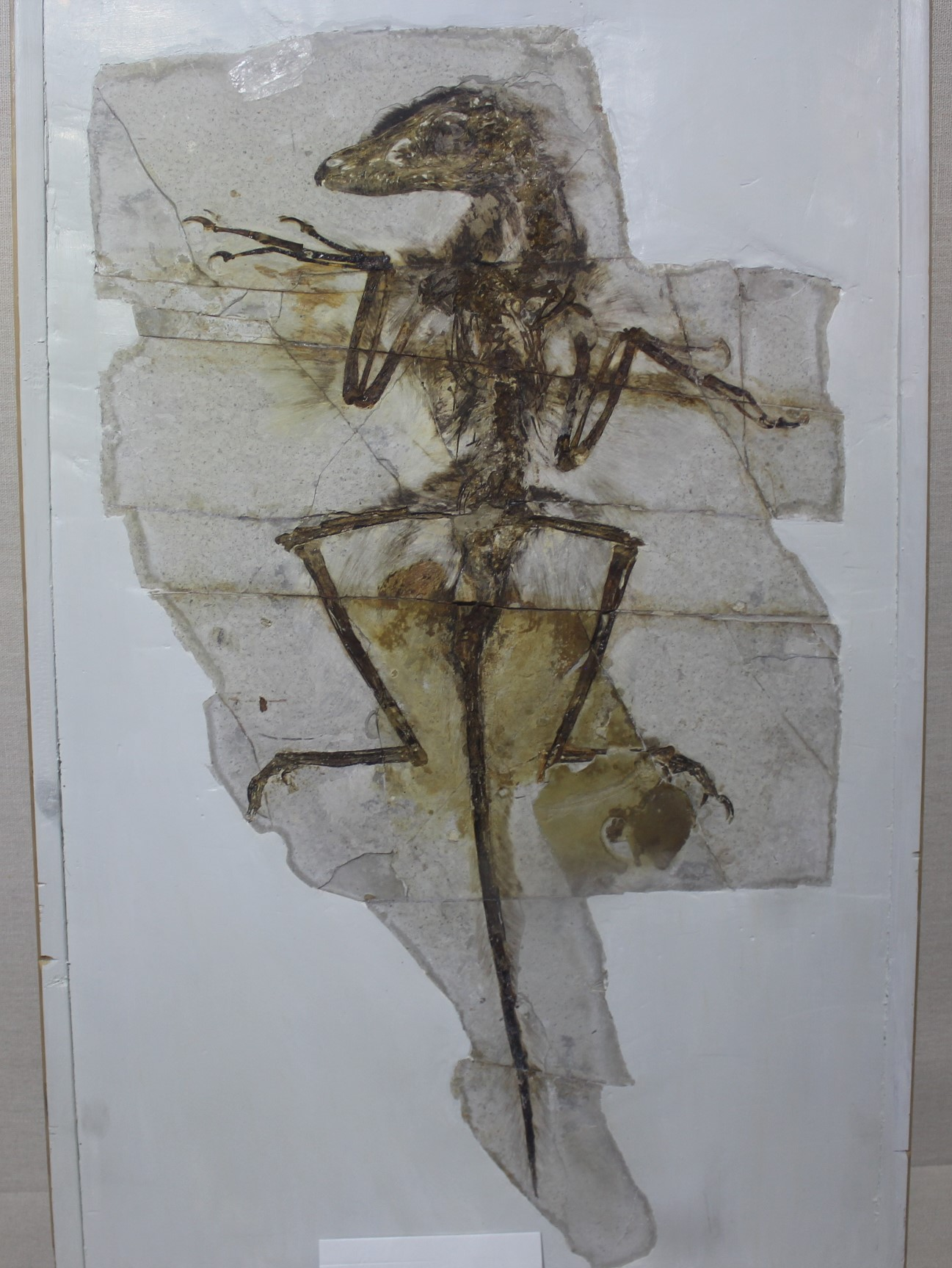
NGMC 91, nicknamed "Dave", at the Geological Museum of China.

Sinornithosaurus was a member of the family Dromaeosauridae, a group of agile, predatory dinosaurs with a distinctive sickle-shaped toe claw, which also includes Deinonychus and Utahraptor. S. millenii lived about 125 million years ago in the Barremian age of the Early Cretaceous period, which makes it among the earliest and most primitive dromaeosaurids yet discovered. Fossils of S. haoiana and the possible Sinornithosaurus specimen NGMC 91 were found in younger strata dating to about 122 million years ago. The presence of vaned feathers on Sinornithosaurus is consistent with feather evidence from other dromaeosaurs.

Two species of Sinornithosaurus have been described. S. millenii ("millennium Chinese bird-lizard") is the type species, described in 1999. A second species, S. haoiana ("Hao's Chinese bird-lizard") was described by Liu et al. in 2004 based on a new specimen, D2140, which differed from S. millenii in features of the skull and hips. However, according to Turner, Makovicky and Norell (2012) the supposed distinguishing features of S. haoiana "are either present in Sinornithosaurus millenii or variable among the number of Sinornithosaurus specimens"; the authors considered S. haoiana to be a junior synonym of S. millenii. In 2024, the new informal combination name "Jeholraptor" haoiana was coined by Gregory S. Paul in the third edition of The Princeton Field Guide to Dinosaurs.

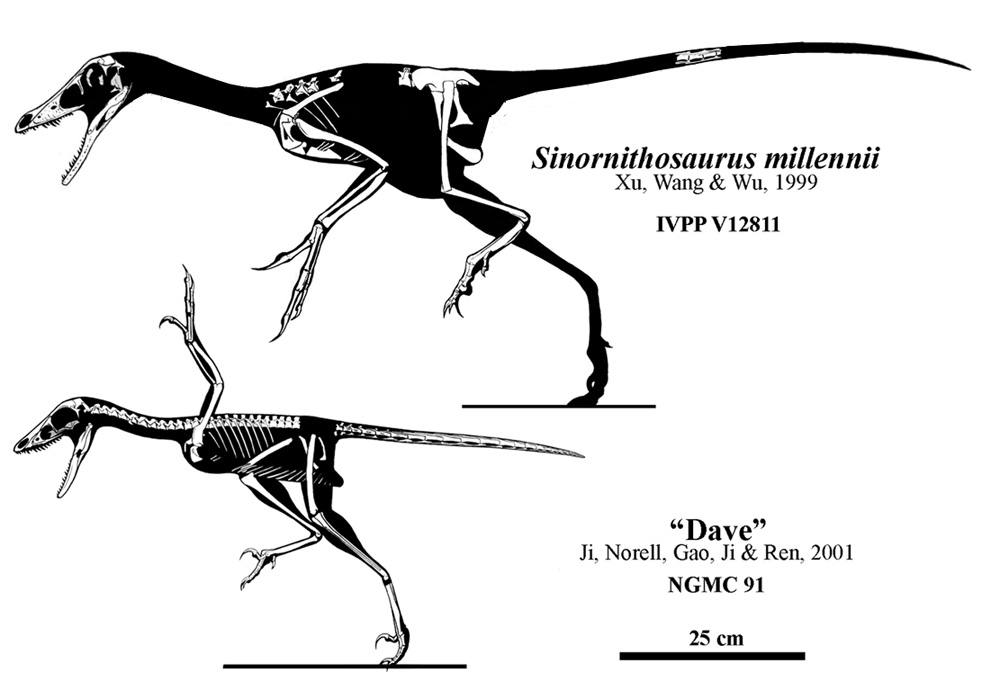
Skeletal reconstructions of S. millenii and NGMC 91

An incredibly well-preserved microraptorian nicknamed "Dave" (specimen NGMC 91), was first described in a paper published in the journal Nature by Ji Qiang and colleagues in 2001. They declined to name the specimen because, although it is completely articulated, almost all of the bones shattered when the fossil slabs were split, so that only the silhouettes of these bones are clear in most of the part and counterpart. This obscured diagnostic skeletal features, which made the specimen's genus uncertain. They noted that it was similar in some respects to Sinornithosaurus millenii, and they suggested that the differences between the two could have been due to age. Ji, along with another team of scientists, further emphasized this similarity in a 2002 paper, in which they formally referred the specimen to Sinornithosaurus, though they considered the exact species questionable. Meanwhile, Stephen Czerkas and colleagues considered the specimen to represent an example of their newly described species Cryptovolans pauli (now usually considered a synonym of Microraptor gui), based on supposed wing proportions.

Phylogenetic studies did not support the idea that NGMC 91 was a close relative of S. millenii. In a 2004 analysis, Phil Senter and colleagues found that it was, in fact, more closely related to Microraptor. Subsequent studies, also by Senter, have continued to show support for this finding despite the fact that some data used in the original study was later found to be flawed.

However, in a 2011 publication Senter stated that a personal examination of the holotype of S. millenii led him to conclude that his earlier separation of NGMC 91 from S. millenii was based on anatomical misinterpretations. As the two specimens were "identical in all character states" used in his phylogenetic analysis, were from similar stratigraphic levels and "uniquely share the presence of a triangular coracoid with a large, oval foramen", Senter concluded that NGMC 91 does belong to the species Sinornithosaurus millenii.

The same conclusion was also reached independently from Senter by Turner, Makovicky and Norell (2012). According to these authors, NGMC 91 shares several apomorphies with both Microraptor zhaoianus and Sinornithosaurus millenii; however, as it "lacks elongate middle caudals that are three to four times the length of the dorsal vertebrae", it cannot be referred to M. zhaoianus. On the other hand, it does possess a posteriorly bifurcated dentary, which is an apomorphy of Sinornithosaurus. The authors concluded that NGMC 91 was a subadult specimen of S. millenii.

Cladogram (2012):

- Dromaeosauridae
  - Xiaotingia
  - - Unenlagiinae
    - - Shanag
      - - Eudromaeosauria
          - Saurornitholestinae
          - - Velociraptorinae
            - Dromaeosaurinae
        - Microraptoria
          - Tianyuraptor
          - - Hesperonychus
            - - - Microraptor sp.
                - - Microraptor gui
                  - Microraptor zhaoianus
              - - Cryptovolans
                - Graciliraptor
                - Sinornithosaurus

== Discovery and specimens ==
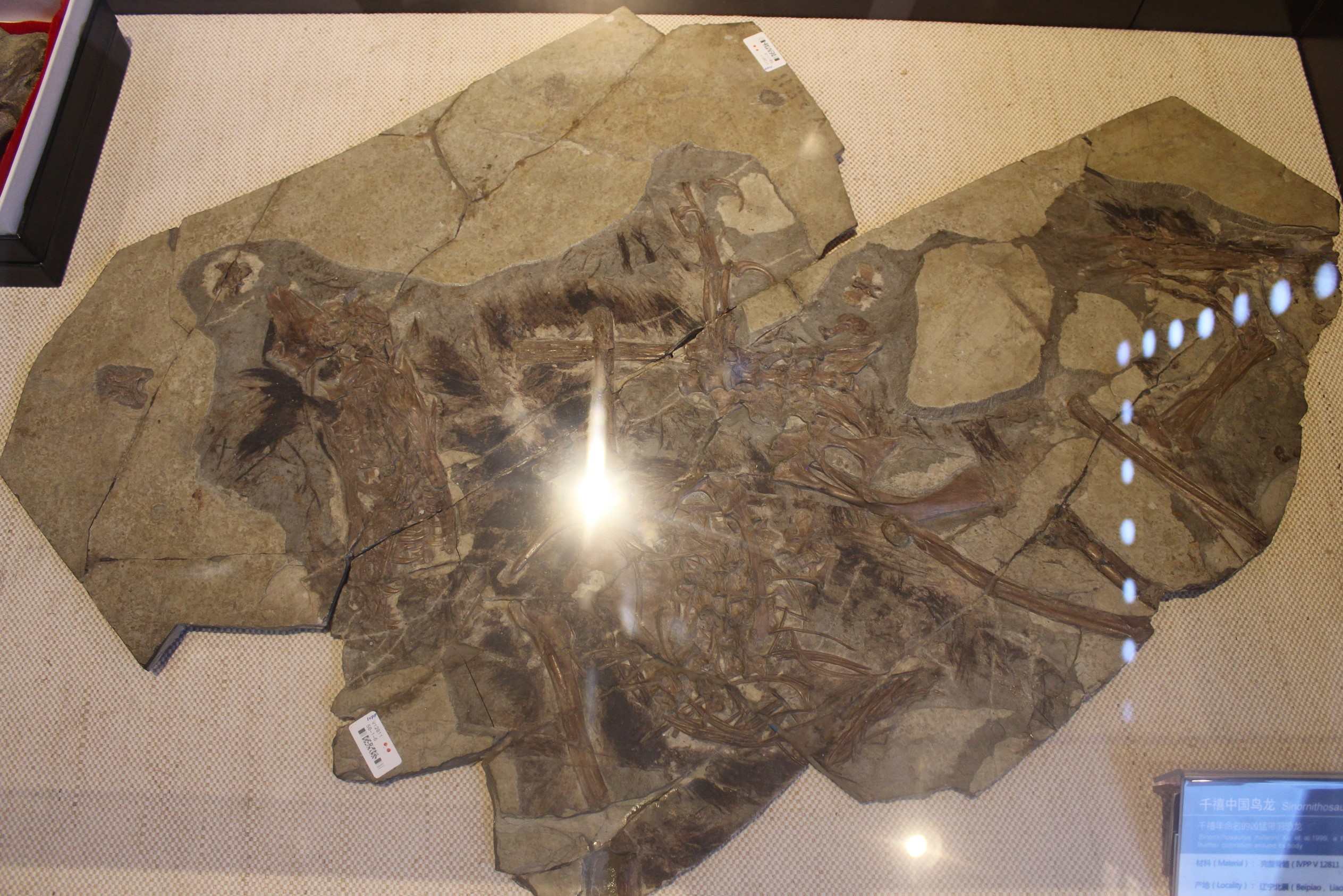
The holotype specimen on display at the Paleozoological Museum of China.

Sinornithosaurus was discovered by Xu Xing, Wang Xiaolin and Wu Xiaochun of the Institute of Vertebrate Paleontology and Paleoanthropology of Beijing. An almost-complete fossil with feather impressions, was recovered from Liaoning Province, China, in the Yixian Formation; the same incredibly rich location where four dinosaurs with feathers were discovered previously, Protarchaeopteryx, Sinosauropteryx, Caudipteryx, and Beipiaosaurus. Sinornithosaurus was the first dromaeosaurid discovered with feathers. The holotype specimen is IVPP V12811, in the collection of the Institute of Vertebrate Paleontology and Paleoanthropology in Beijing, China.

The NGMC 91 specimen is in the collection of the National Geological Museum of China. It was collected in Fanzhangzi quarry, near Lingyuan City, Liaoning Province. This location is part of the Dawangzhangzi fossil beds, which have been dated to about 122 million years ago, during the early Aptian age. A specimen of the fish Lycoptera is also preserved near the foot.

== See also ==
- Dinosaur coloration
- Feathered dinosaurs
- Microraptor
- Rahonavis
- Velociraptor
- Timeline of dromaeosaurid research
